= The Forgotten King (film) =

- Film poster
- Directed by: Nikoloz Khomasuridze
- Written by: Nikoloz Khomasuridze
- Produced by: Nikoloz Khomasuridze
- Starring: Misha Arobelidze, Kakha Abuashvili, Temo Barbaqadze, Elguja Burduli, Nugzar Chikovani, Givi Chuguashvili
- Cinematography: Jon Edwards
- Music by: Chabuka Amiranashvili
- Release date: 10 October 2013
- Running time: 105 minutes
- Country: Georgia
- Language: Georgian
- Budget: €650,000

The Forgotten King (Georgian: დავიწყებული მეფე) is a 2013 film set in Georgia in the early 12th century. The film broke the world record for being made in 105 minutes using continuous frame. It was directed by Nikoloz Khomasuridze.

== Plot and themes ==
A Georgian couple travel through time; historical figures including Queen Tamar, Shota Rustaveli, Ilia Chavchavadze, Stalin, and Hitler appear as Khomasuridze connects issues in present-day Georgia to its past. The film includes passages from Rustaveli's classic poem "The Knight in the Tiger's Skin".

== Production ==
The Forgotten King consists of a continuous 105-minute shot, with exteriors in the Tbilisi streets and interiors in a pavilion.

== Cast ==
- Misha Arobelidze as Soviet Soldier#2
- Kakha Abuashvili as Soviet Soldier#4
- Temo Barbaqadze as Lavrenti Beria
- Elguja Burduli as Shota Rustaveli
- Nugzar Chikovani as Ilia Chavchavadze
- Givi Chuguashvili as Jacques De Molay, Grand Master of the Knights Templar

== See also ==
- List of historical drama films
