= Justinian I =

Roman emperor from 527 to 565

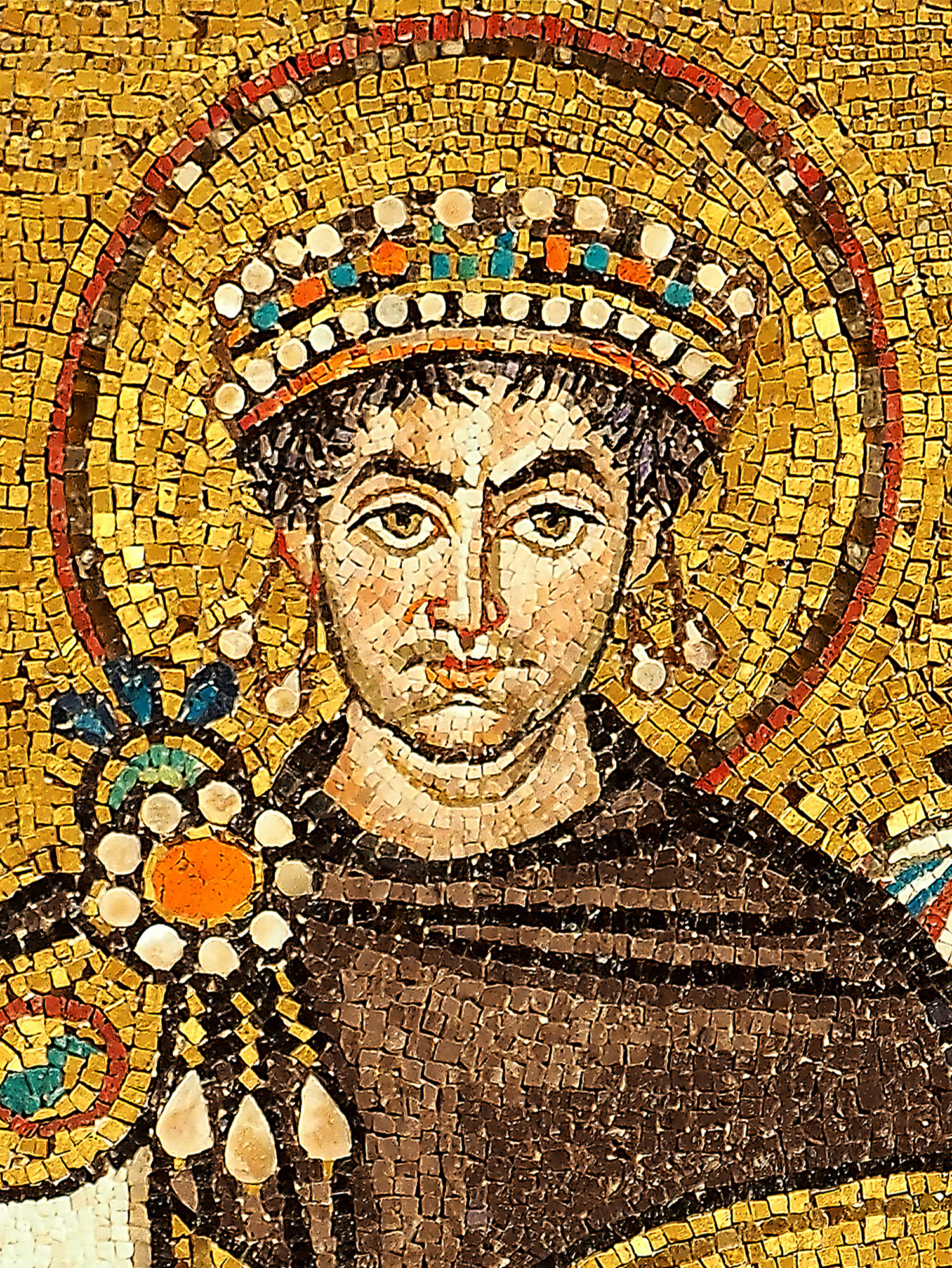
- Detail of a mosaic of Justinian in the Basilica of San Vitale in Ravenna, AD 547

Eastern Roman emperor
- Augustus: 1 April 527 – 14 November 565
- Coronation: 1 April 527
- Predecessor: Justin I
- Successor: Justin II
- Co-emperor: Justin I (until 1 August 527)
- Caesar: c. 525 – 1 April 527
- Born: Petrus Sabbatius; 482; Tauresium (probably Gradište near Skopje), Eastern Roman Empire
- Died: 14 November 565 (aged 82/83); Constantinople, Eastern Roman Empire
- Burial: Church of the Holy Apostles
- Spouse: Theodora (m. 525; d. 548)
Names
- Petrus Sabbatius Iustinianus
Regnal name
- Imperator Caesar Flavius Petrus Sabbatius Iustinianus Augustus (Note: The sole source for Justinian's full name are consular diptychs of the year 521, which refer to him as Flavius Petrus Sabbatius Iustinianus. The name Flavius had become a courtesy title by the late 4th century and was no longer used as a personal name. Justinian's full titulature, as attested in his Institutes, was Imperator Caesar Flavius Iustinianus Alamannicus Gothicus Francicus Germanicus Anticus Alanicus Vandalicus Africanus pius felix inclitus victor ac triumphator semper Augustus (Imperator Caesar Flavius Justinian, victor over the Alamanni, Goths, Franks, Germans, Antes, Alans, Vandals, Africans; pious, fortunate, renowned, victorious and triumphant, ever Augustus))
- Dynasty: Justinian dynasty
- Father: Sabbatius (biological); Justin I (adoptive)
- Mother: Vigilantia
- Religion: Chalcedonian Christianity

Justinian I (Note: /dʒʌˈstɪniən/ just-IN-ee-ən) (Latin: Iustinianus, Byzantine Greek: Ἰουστινιανός, romanized: Ioustinianós; (Note: Latin pronunciation: [juːs.tiː.niˈaː.nʊs]; Byzantine Greek pronunciation: [i.us.ti.ni.aˈnos]) (Note: Full name in Latin: Flāvius Petrus Sabbatius Iūstīniānus, [ˈfɫaː.wi.ʊs ˈpɛ.trʊs sabˈba.ti.ʊs juːs.tiː.niˈaː.nʊs]; Byzantine Greek: Φλάβιος Πέτρος Σαββάτιος Ἰουστινιανός, romanized: Flávios Pétros Savvátios Ioustinianós, [ˈfla.vi.os ˈpe.tros savˈva.ti.os i.us.ti.ni.aˈnos]) 482 – 14 November 565), also known as Justinian the Great, (Note: Latin: Iūstīniānus Magnus, [juːs.tiː.niˈaː.nʊs ˈmaŋ.nʊs]; Byzantine Greek: Ἰουστινιανός ὁ Μέγας, romanized: Ioustinianós o Mégas, [i.us.ti.ni.aˈnos o ˈme.ɣas].) was Roman emperor from 527 to 565. His reign was marked by the ambitious but only partly realized renovatio imperii ('restoration of the Empire'). This ambition was expressed by the partial recovery of the territories of the defunct Western Roman Empire.

His general, Belisarius, swiftly conquered the Vandal Kingdom in North Africa. Subsequently, Belisarius, Narses, and other generals conquered the Ostrogothic Kingdom, restoring Dalmatia, Sicily, Italy, and Rome to the empire after more than half a century of rule by the Ostrogoths. The praetorian prefect Liberius reclaimed the south of the Iberian Peninsula, establishing the province of Spania. These campaigns re-established Roman control over the western Mediterranean, increasing the Empire's annual revenue by over a million solidi. During his reign, Justinian also subdued the Tzani, a people on the east coast of the Black Sea that had never been under Roman rule before. He engaged the Sasanian Empire in the east during Kavad I's reign, and later again during Khosrow I's reign; this second conflict was partially initiated due to his ambitions in the west.

Justinian is regarded as one of the most prominent and influential Roman emperors, with numerous accomplishments achieved during his reign. One of the most enduring aspects of his legacy was the uniform rewriting of Roman law, the Corpus Juris Civilis, which was first applied throughout the Eastern Mediterranean and is still the basis of civil law in many modern states. His reign also marked a blossoming of Byzantine culture, and his building program yielded works such as the Hagia Sophia. Conversely, Justinian's reign was troubled by religious conflicts between Chalcedonian and non-Chalcedonian Christians.

== Life ==
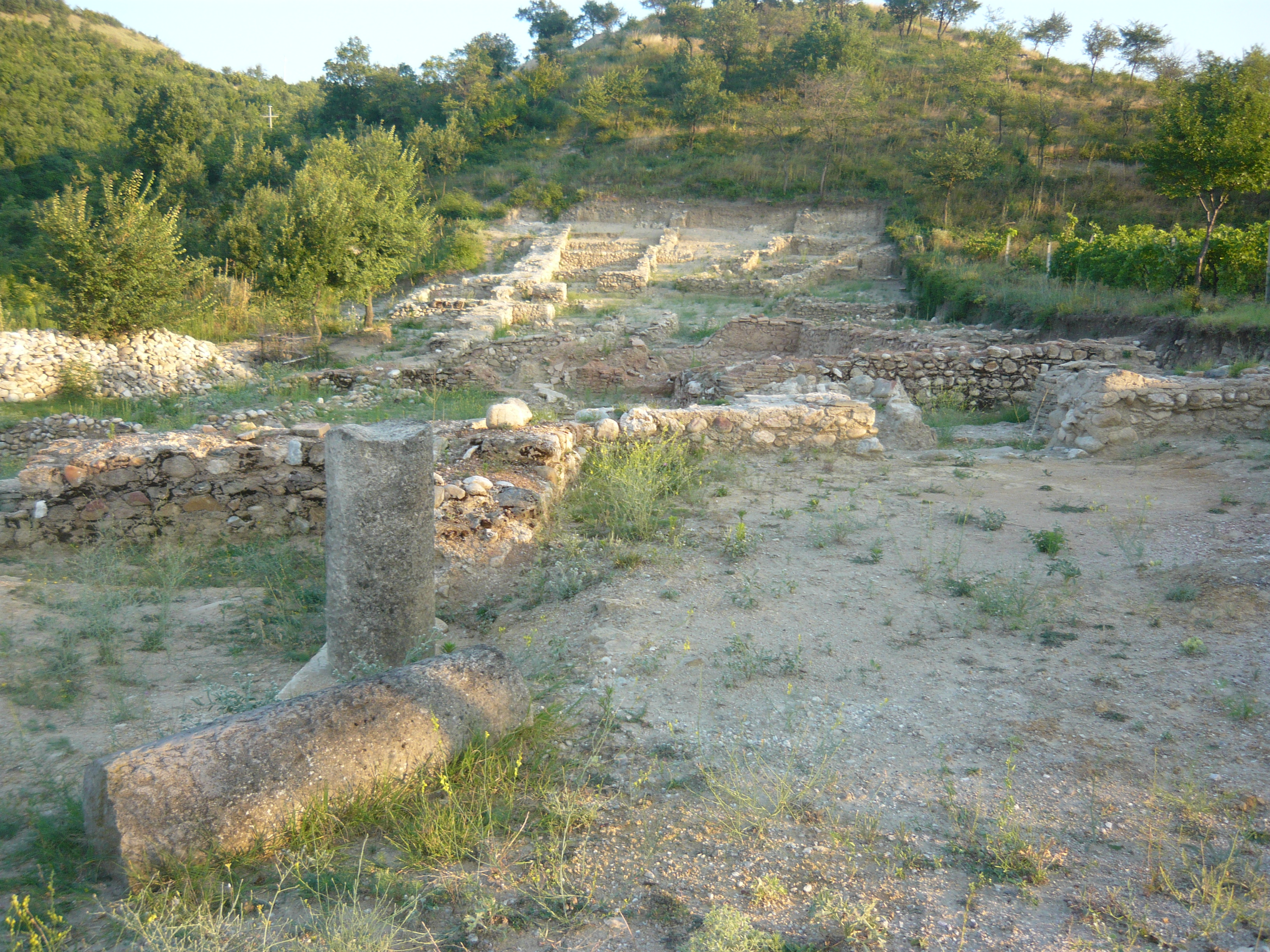
The archaeological site at Tauresium, modern-day Gradište (Skopje) in North Macedonia

According to his contemporary Procopius, Justinian was born in the hamlet of Tauresium in the province of Dardania, near the fortress of Bederiana, and close by the city of Justiniana Prima that he later founded. Later scholarship places his birth around 482. Tauresium is most commonly identified with the archaeological site of Gradište, by the village of Taor about 20 km (12 mi) southeast of Skopje, in what is now North Macedonia, with Bederiana placed at nearby Bader. This identification was first advanced by Arthur Evans and later confirmed by excavations directed by the archaeologist Kiro Ristov. By contrast, the prevailing identification of Justiniana Prima remains the site of Caričin Grad, which is located near Naissus (modern Niš) in Serbia, a location supported by the site's correspondence to Procopius' description and by lead seals of its archbishop. The considerable distance between the two sites, which is at odds with Procopius' statement that Justinian built the city close to his birthplace, has prompted scholarly debate about the place of his birthplace.

A native speaker of Latin (among the last Eastern Roman emperors to be one), he came from a peasant family thought to have been of either of Thraco-Roman or Illyro-Roman origin. The name Iustinianus, which he took later, is indicative of adoption by his uncle Justin. During his reign, he founded Justiniana Prima not far from his birthplace. His mother was Vigilantia, the sister of Justin. Justin, who was commander of one of the imperial guard units (the Excubitors) before he became emperor, adopted Justinian, brought him to Constantinople, and ensured the boy's education. As a result, Justinian was well educated in jurisprudence, theology, and Roman history. Justinian served as a candidatus, one of 40 men selected from the scholae palatinae to serve as the emperor's personal bodyguard. The chronicler John Malalas, who lived during the reign of Justinian, describes his appearance as short, fair-skinned, curly-haired, round-faced, and handsome, with receding hairline and greying hair and beard. Another contemporary historian, Procopius, describing him in similar terms, compares Justinian's appearance to that of Emperor Domitian, although this may be an allusion to one of the most despised men in Roman history.

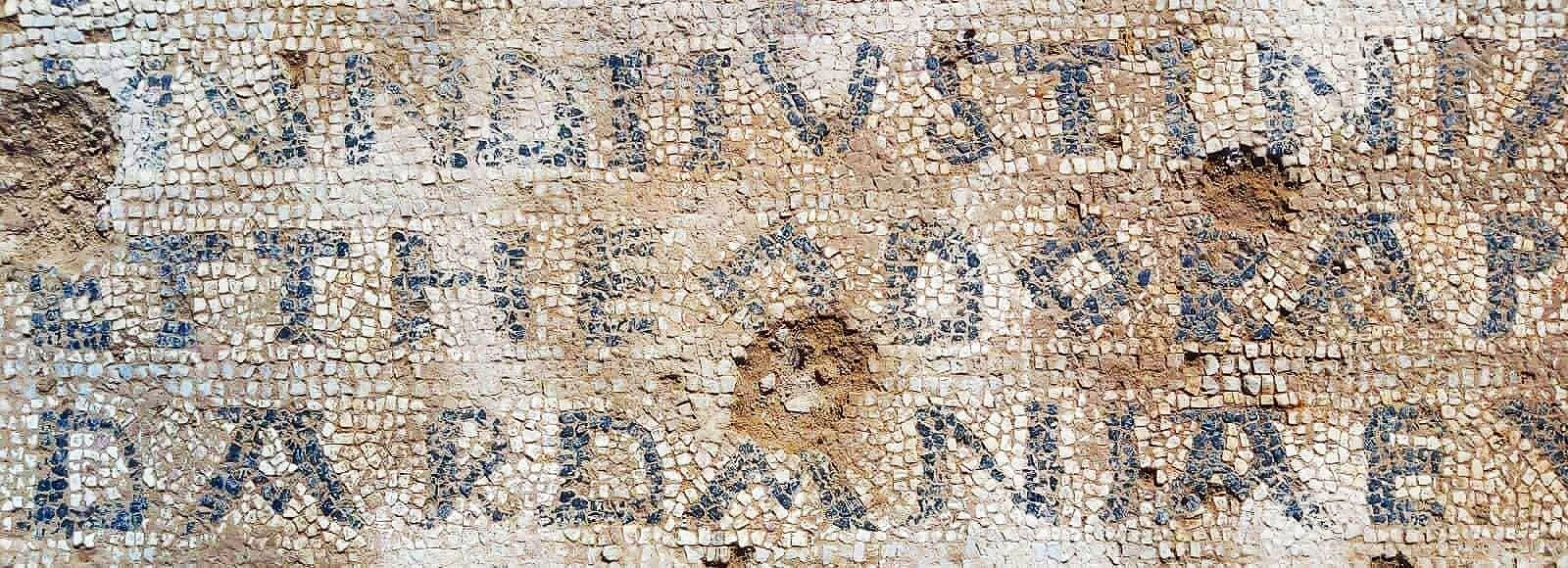
Mosaic dedicated to Emperor Justinian the Great. Unearthed 2023 in Justiniana Secunda. (modern-day Ulpiana) in Kosovo.

When Emperor Anastasius died in 518, Justin was proclaimed the new emperor with significant help from Justinian. Justinian showed a lot of ambition, and several sources claim that he was functioning as virtual regent long before Justin made him associate emperor, although there is no conclusive evidence of this. As Justin became senile near the end of his reign, Justinian became the de facto ruler. Following the general Vitalian's assassination in 520 (orchestrated by Justinian or Justin), Justinian was appointed consul and commander of the army of the east. Justinian remained Justin's close confidant, and in 525 was granted the titles of nobilissimus and caesar (heir-apparent). He was crowned co-emperor on 1 April 527, (Note: Constantine VII's De Ceremoniis dates Justinian's coronation to 4 April, probably a confusion between α (1) and δ (4).) and became sole ruler after Justin's death on 1 August 527.

As a ruler, Justinian showed great energy. He was known as "the emperor who never sleeps" for his work habits. Nevertheless, he seems to have been amiable and easy to approach. Around 525, he married his mistress, Theodora, in Constantinople. She was by profession an actress and prostitute and some twenty years his junior. In earlier times, Justinian could not have married her owing to her class, but his uncle, Emperor Justin I, had lifted restrictions on marriages with ex-actresses. Though the marriage caused a scandal, Theodora would become influential in the politics of the Empire. Other talented individuals included Tribonian, his legal adviser; Peter the Patrician, the diplomat and long-time head of the palace bureaucracy; Justinian's finance ministers John the Cappadocian and Peter Barsymes, who managed to collect taxes more efficiently than any before, thereby funding Justinian's wars; and finally, his generals, Belisarius and Narses, responsible for the re-conquest of North Africa and Italy.

Justinian's rule was not universally popular; early in his reign he nearly lost his throne during the Nika riots, and a conspiracy against the emperor's life by dissatisfied entrepreneurs was discovered as late as 562. Justinian was struck by the plague in the early 540s but recovered. Theodora died in 548 at a relatively young age, possibly of cancer; Justinian outlived her by nearly twenty years. Justinian, who had always had a keen interest in theological matters and actively participated in debates on Christian doctrine, became even more devoted to religion during the later years of his life. He died on 14 November 565, childless. He was succeeded by Justin II, who was the son of his sister Vigilantia and married to Sophia, the niece of Theodora. Justinian's body was entombed in a specially built mausoleum in the Church of the Holy Apostles until it was desecrated and robbed during the pillage of the city in 1204 by the Latin States of the Fourth Crusade.

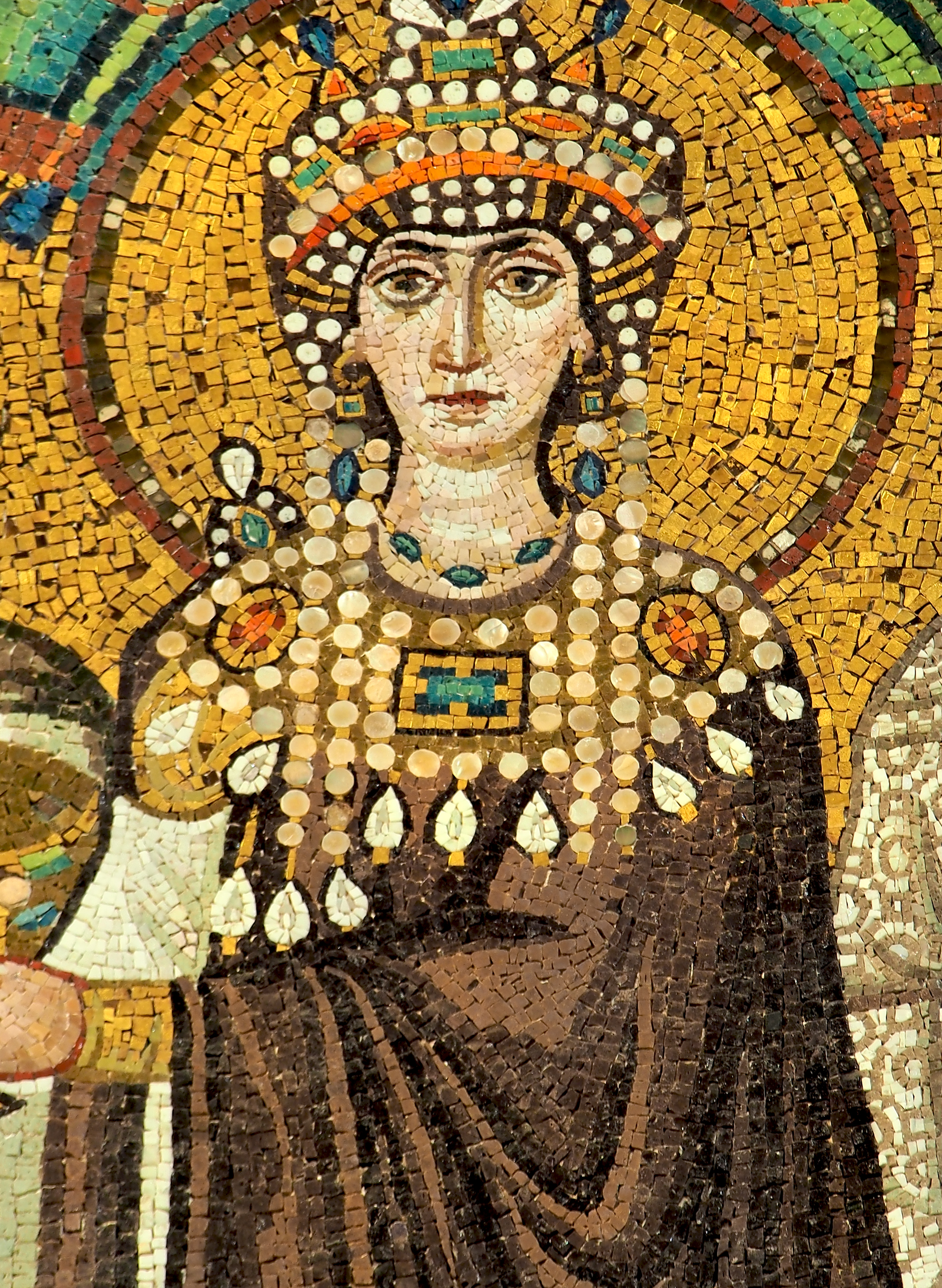
Mosaic of Theodora, Justinian's wife

== Reign ==
=== Legislative activities ===
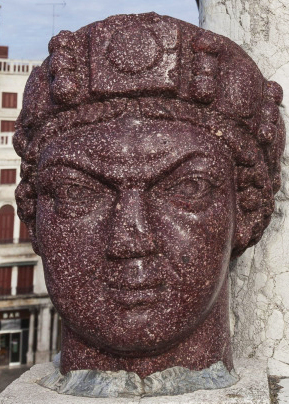
The Carmagnola, an imperial porphyry head in Venice perhaps representing Justinian

Justinian remains well-known for his judicial reforms, particularly through the complete revision of all Roman law, something that had not previously been attempted. The total of Justinian's legislation is known today as the Corpus juris civilis. It consists of the Codex Justinianeus, the Digesta or Pandectae, the Institutiones, and the Novellae.

Early in his reign, Justinian had appointed the quaestor Tribonian to oversee this task. The first draft of the Codex Justinianeus, a codification of imperial constitutions from the 2nd century onward, was issued on 7 April 529. (The final version appeared in 534.) It was followed by the Digesta (or Pandectae), a compilation of older legal texts, in 533, and by the Institutiones, a textbook explaining the principles of law. The Novellae, a collection of new laws issued during Justinian's reign, supplements the Corpus. As opposed to the rest of the corpus, the Novellae appeared in Greek, the common language of the Eastern Empire.

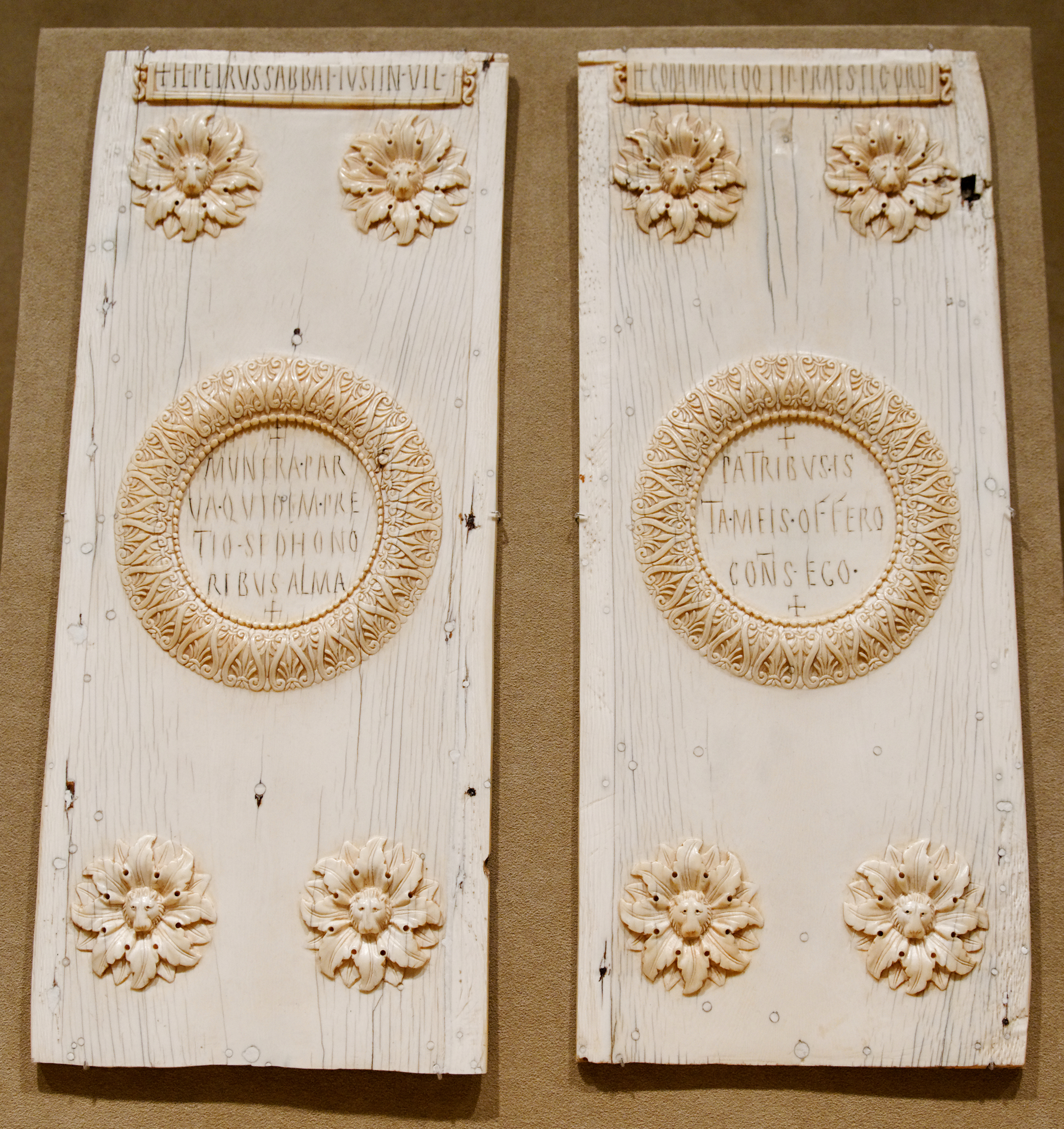
Consular diptych announcing the consulship of Justinian in 521; his name and title inscribed in Latin: FL[AVIUS] PETRUS SABBAT[IUS] IUSTIN[IANUS], V[IR] I[N]L[USTRIS]

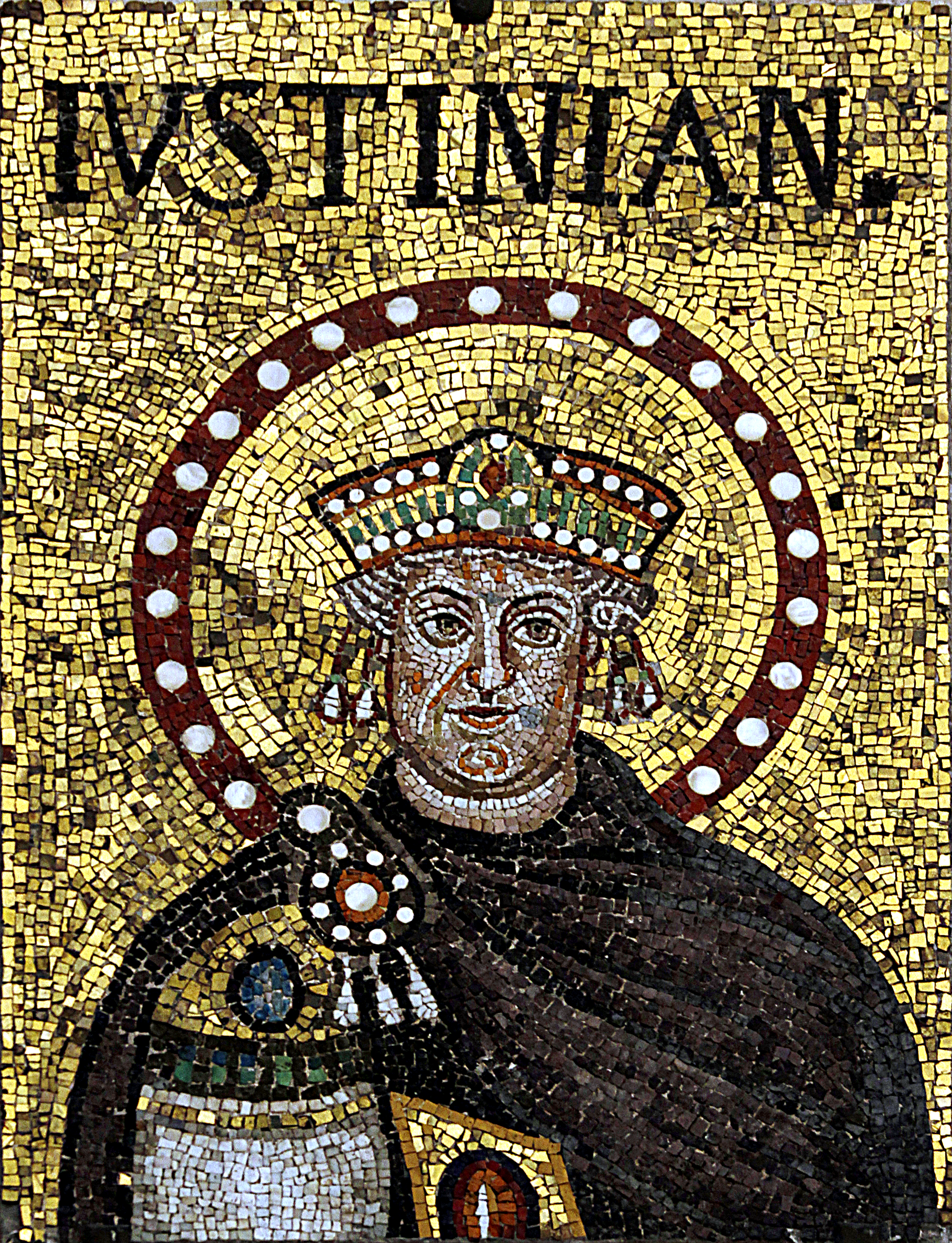
An older Justinian; mosaic in Basilica of Sant'Apollinare Nuovo, Ravenna (possibly a modified portrait of Theodoric)

The Corpus forms the basis of Latin jurisprudence (including ecclesiastical Canon Law) and, for historians, provides a valuable insight into the concerns and activities of the later Roman Empire. As a collection it gathers together the many sources in which the leges (laws) and the other rules were expressed or published: proper laws, senatorial consults (senatusconsulta), imperial decrees, case law, and jurists' opinions and interpretations (responsa prudentium). Tribonian's code ensured the survival of Roman law. It formed the basis of later Byzantine law, as expressed in the Basilika of Basil I and Leo VI the Wise. The only western province where the Justinianic code was introduced was Italy (after the conquest by the so-called Pragmatic Sanction of 554), from where it was to pass to Western Europe in the 12th century and become the basis of much Continental European law code, which was eventually spread by European empires to the Americas and beyond in the Age of Discovery. It eventually passed to Eastern Europe where it appeared in Slavic editions, and it also passed on to Russia. It remains influential to this day.

His legislations restricted avenues of divorce, including divorce by mutual consent. The latter was overturned by his immediate successor, Justin II.

He passed laws to protect prostitutes from exploitation and women from being forced into prostitution. Rapists were treated severely. Further, by his policies: women charged with major crimes should be guarded by other women to prevent sexual abuse; if a woman was widowed, her dowry should be returned; and a husband could not take on a major debt without his wife giving her consent twice.

Family legislation also revealed a greater concern for the interests of children. This was particularly so with respect to children born out of wedlock. The law under Justinian also reveals a striking interest in child neglect issues. Justinian protected the rights of children whose parents remarried and produced more offspring, or who simply separated and abandoned their offspring, forcing them to beg.

Justinian also improved the rights of slaves. Slaves were given the right to plead personally for their freedom, and a master killing his slave would be classified as murder. Justinian acknowledged that slavery was an unnatural state of human existence and not a feature of natural law. The Justinian law retained the principle that a slave was an item of property, but it did not state that a slave was devoid of personhood.

He made laws against male homosexual acts, claiming they “cause earthquakes and famine” and arguing that they were a form of “atheism.” He enacted the law retrospectively, and a person could be convicted on the testimony of a single witness. Those convicted had their genitals cut off and were paraded through the streets.

Furthermore he passed legislation directed against philosophers, astrologers, heretics, pagans, Manicheans, Jews and Samaritans, forbidding them from holding public office, destroying their places of worship and restricting the ownership of property.

Justinian discontinued the regular appointment of Consuls in 541. Also, he was the first emperor to claim in a law that, by God’s authority, he was the incarnation of the law and therefore above it.

=== Nika riots ===
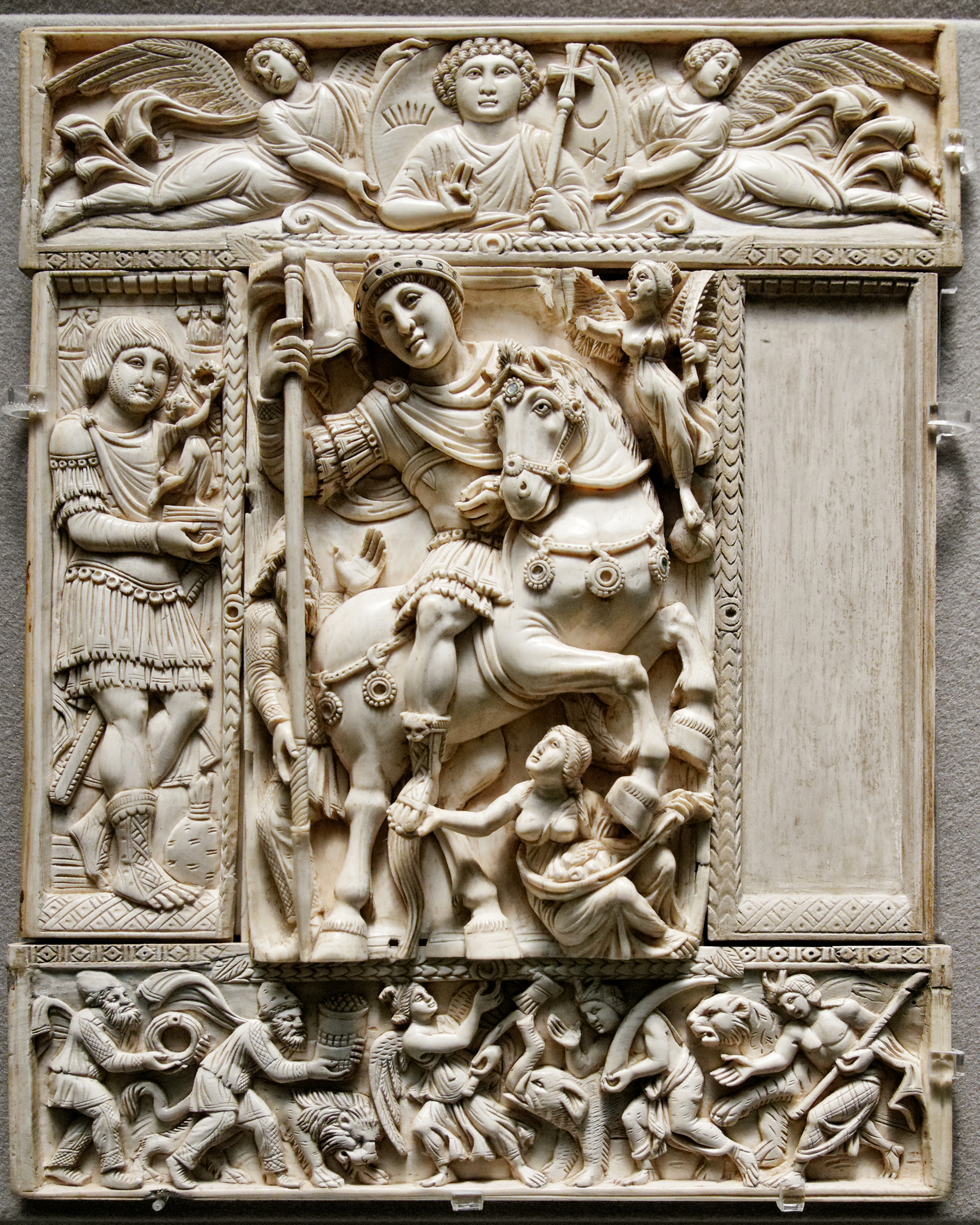
The Barberini Ivory, thought to portray either Justinian or Anastasius I

In January 532, partisans of the chariot racing factions in Constantinople, normally rivals, united against Justinian in a revolt that has become known as the Nika riots. They forced him to dismiss Tribonian and two of his other ministers, and then attempted to overthrow Justinian himself and replace him with the senator Hypatius, who was a nephew of the late emperor Anastasius. While the crowd was rioting in the streets, Justinian considered fleeing the capital by sea, but eventually decided to stay, apparently on the prompting of his wife Theodora, who refused to leave. In the next two days, he ordered the brutal suppression of the riots by his generals Belisarius and Mundus. Procopius relates that 30,000 unarmed civilians were killed in the Hippodrome. Justinian had Anastasius' nephews executed. (Note: According to one source, this came at Theodora's insistence, and apparently against his own judgment.)

The damage caused by the riots was extensive. The rioters destroyed governmental buildings, state archives, hospices, hospitals and charitable institutions. The patients of the Hospice of Samson were all killed during the riots and the fires caused by the rioters reached as far as the Baths of Zeuxippus, which contained famous statues and monuments. The destruction that took place during the revolt provided Justinian with an opportunity to carry out his building program in Constantinople, most notably the architectural innovation of the domed Hagia Sophia.

=== Military activities ===
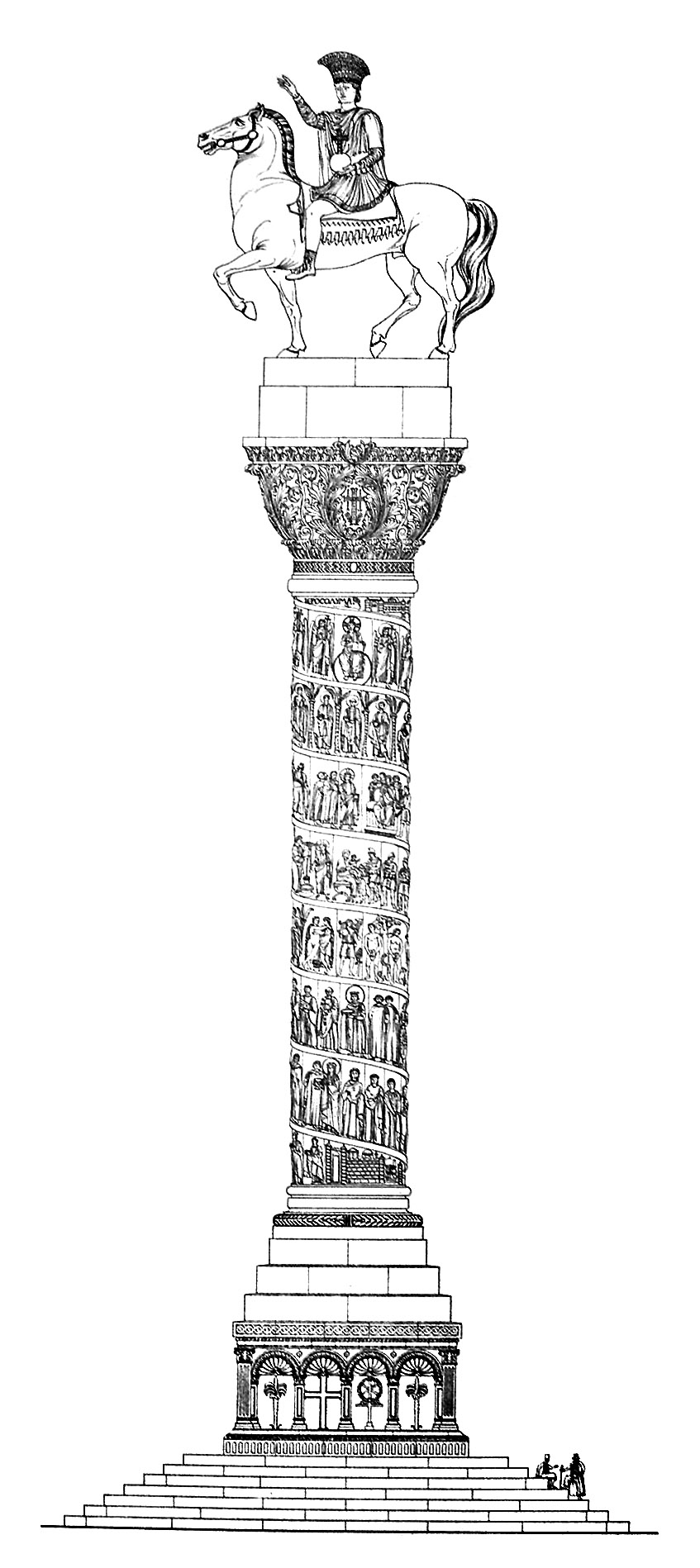
Reconstruction of the Column of Justinian, after Cornelius Gurlitt, 1912. The column was erected in the Augustaeum in Constantinople in 543 in honour of his military victories.

Justinian's reign was marked by the recovery of large stretches of land around the Western Mediterranean basin that had slipped out of imperial control in the 5th century. Although he never personally took part in military campaigns, he boasted of his successes in the prefaces to his laws and had them commemorated in art. The re-conquests were in large part carried out by his general Belisarius. (Note: Justinian himself took the field only once, during a campaign against the Huns in 559, when he was already an old man. This enterprise was largely symbolic and although no battle was fought, the emperor held a triumphal entry in the capital afterwards. (See Browning, R. Justinian and Theodora. London 1971, 193.))

==== War with the Sassanid Empire, 527–532 ====
From his uncle, Justinian inherited ongoing hostilities with the Sasanian Empire. In 530 the Persian forces suffered a double defeat at Dara and Satala, but the next year saw the defeat of Roman forces under Belisarius near Callinicum. To counter the growing influence of the Persians in the Arabian Peninsula, Justinian occupied the Tiran Island and established a client network across the coast of Western Arabia, Central Arabia, and attempted to bring Himyar (the South Arabian kingdom) and Aksum (the Ethiopian kingdom) under his sway. However, his attempts to make alliances with the Axumites of Ethiopia and the Himyarites of Yemen against the Persians failed. When the Sasanian emperor Kavad I died in September 531, Justinian concluded an "Eternal Peace" (which cost him 11,000 pounds of gold) with his successor Khosrau I (532). Having thus secured his eastern frontier, Justinian turned his attention to the West, where Germanic peoples had established kingdoms in the territories of the former Western Roman Empire.

==== Conquest of North Africa, 533–534 ====
The first of the western kingdoms Justinian attacked was that of the Vandals in North Africa. King Hilderic, who had maintained good relations with Justinian and the North African Catholic clergy, had been overthrown by his cousin Gelimer in 530. Imprisoned, the deposed king appealed to Justinian. Justinian protested Gelimer's actions, demanding that Gelimer return the kingdom to Hilderic. Gelimer replied, in effect, that Justinian had no authority to make these demands. Angered at this response, Justinian quickly concluded his ongoing war with the Sasanians and prepared an expedition against the Vandals in 533.

In 533, Belisarius sailed to Africa with a fleet of 92 dromons, escorting 500 transports carrying an army of about 15,000 men, as well as a number of barbarian troops. They landed at Caput Vada (now Ras Kaboudia, now in Chebba in Tunisia). They defeated the Vandals, who were caught completely off guard, at Ad Decimum on 14 September 533 and Tricamarum in December; Belisarius took Carthage. King Gelimer fled to Mount Pappua in Numidia, but surrendered the next spring. He was taken to Constantinople, where he was paraded in a Triumph. Sardinia and Corsica, the Balearic Islands, and the stronghold of Septem Fratres (now Ceuta) near the Rock of Gibraltar (Latin Mons Calpe) were recovered in the same campaign.

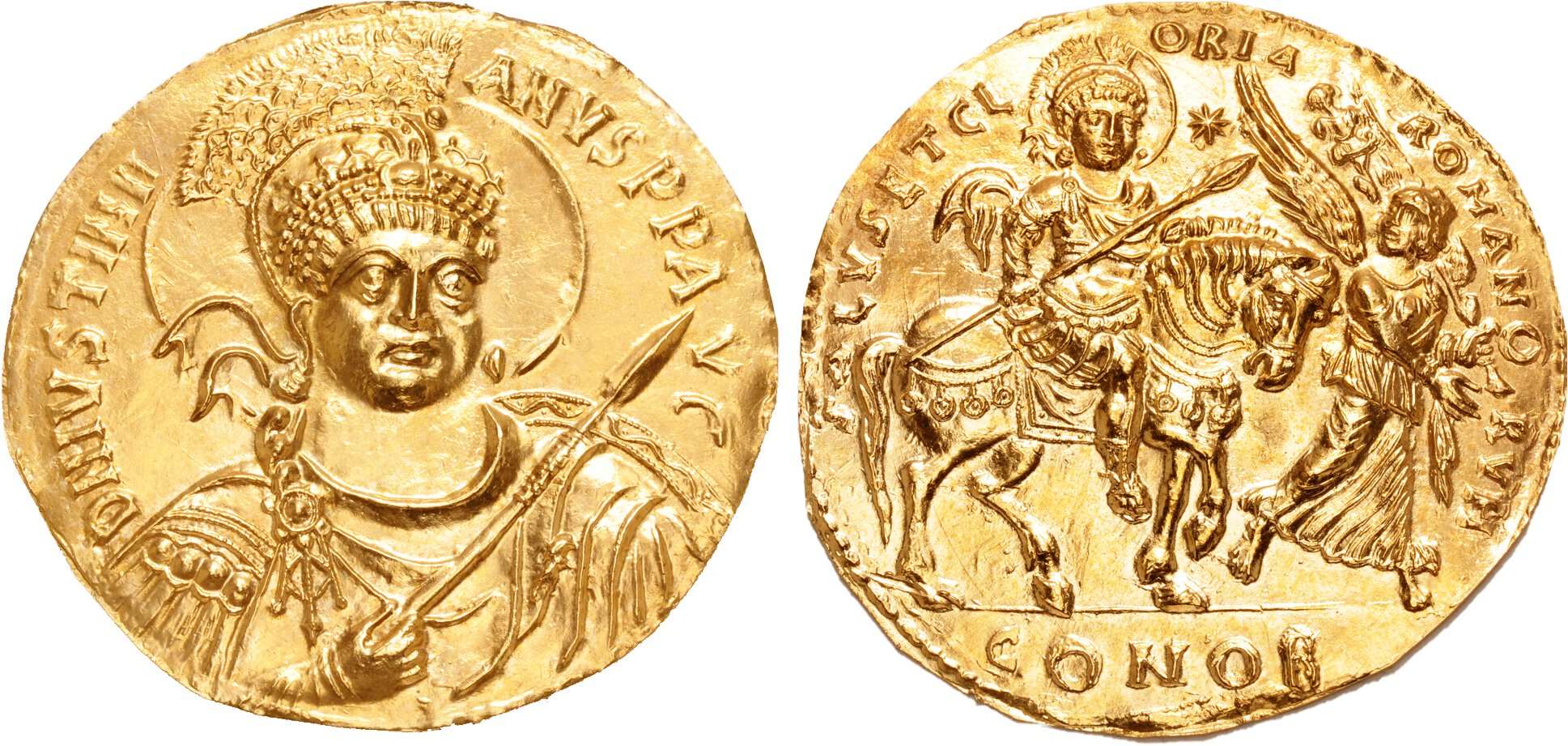
Gilt electrotype of a now-lost gold medallion celebrating the reconquest of Africa, AD 534

In this war, the contemporary Procopius remarks that the coastal region of North Africa known in Latin as 'Africa' was so entirely depopulated that a person might travel several days without meeting a human being, and he adds, "it is no exaggeration to say, that in the course of the war 5,000,000 perished by the sword, and famine, and pestilence." However, JAS Evans casts doubt on Procopius' claims, and asserts that there was a large building program following the conquest, and despite periods of unrest, Africa was generally flourishing. A praetorian prefecture of Africa, centred in Carthage, was established in April 534, but it would teeter on the brink of collapse during the next 15 years, amidst warfare with the Mauri and military mutinies. By the mid-540s, under a succession of Byzantine generals, the region was disrupted under civil war, plague and military campaigning. The area was not completely pacified until 548, but remained peaceful thereafter and enjoyed a measure of prosperity. The recovery of Africa cost the empire about 100,000 pounds of gold.

==== War in Italy, first phase, 535–540 ====
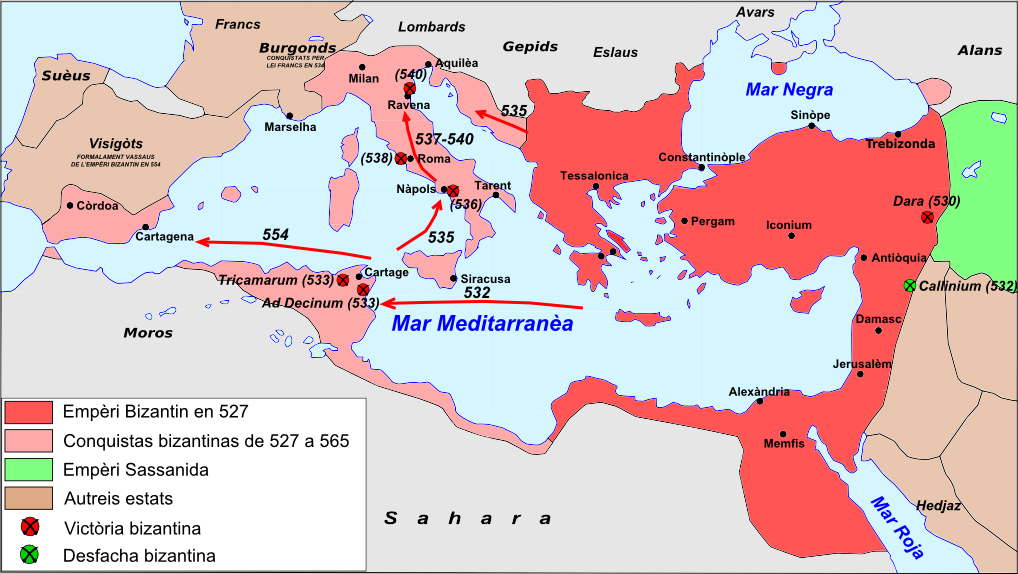
Justinian's conquests

As in Africa, dynastic struggles in the Amal dynasty ruling the Ostrogothic Kingdom of Italy and the northern Balkans provided an opportunity for intervention. The young king Athalaric had died on 2 October 534, and a usurper, Theodahad, had imprisoned queen Amalasuintha, Theodoric's daughter and mother of Athalaric, on the island of Martana in Lake Bolsena, where he had her assassinated in 535. Thereupon Belisarius, with 7,500 men, invaded Sicily (535) and advanced into Italy, sacking Naples and capturing Rome on 9 December 536. By that time Theodahad had been deposed by the Ostrogothic army, who had elected Vitiges as their new king. He gathered a large army and besieged Rome from February 537 to March 538 without being able to retake the city.

Justinian sent another general, Narses, to Italy, but tensions between Narses and Belisarius hampered the progress of the campaign. Milan (Mediolanum) was taken, but was soon recaptured and razed by the Ostrogoths. Justinian recalled Narses in 539. By then the military situation had turned in favour of the Romans, and in 540 Belisarius laid siege to the capital of Ravenna. There he was offered the title of Western Roman Emperor by the Ostrogoths at the same time envoys of Justinian were arriving to negotiate a peace that would leave the region north of the Po in Gothic hands. Belisarius feigned acceptance of the offer, entered the city in May 540, and reclaimed it for the Empire. Then, having been recalled by Justinian, Belisarius returned to Constantinople, taking the captured Vitiges and his queen Mataswintha with him.

==== War with the Sassanid Empire, 540–562 ====
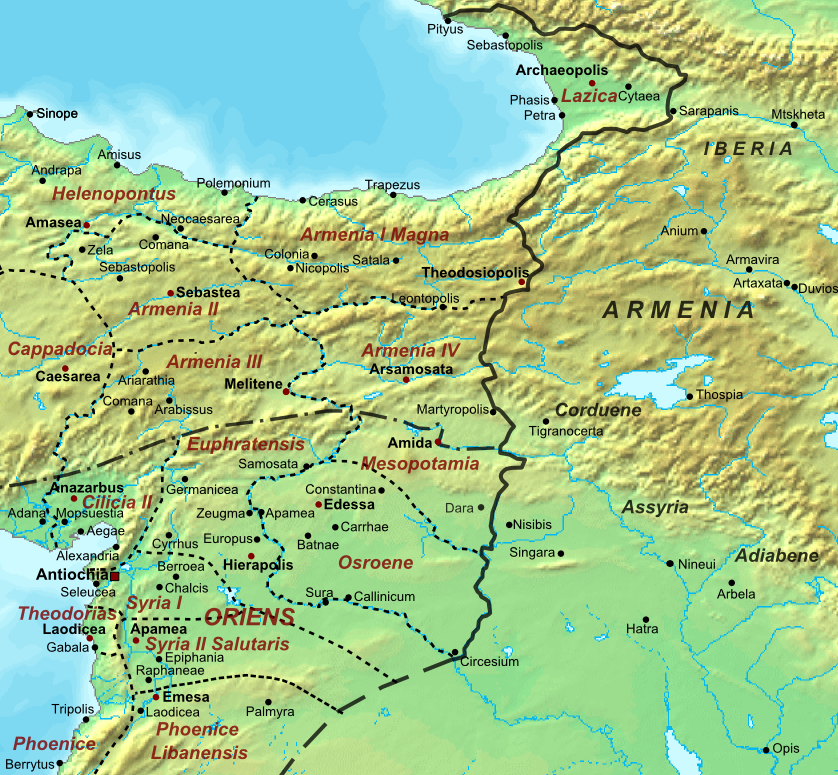
Map of the Byzantine–Sasanian frontier in 565. In 541, the small but strategic region of Lazica on the eastern shore of the Black Sea became the new battlefield of the Roman–Persian Wars.

Belisarius had been recalled in the face of renewed hostilities by the Persians. Following a revolt against the Empire in Armenia in the late 530s and possibly motivated by the pleas of Ostrogothic ambassadors, King Khosrau I broke the "Eternal Peace" and invaded Roman territory in the spring of 540. He first sacked Beroea and then Antioch (allowing the garrison of 6,000 men to leave the city), besieged Daras, and then went on to attack the Byzantine base in the small but strategically significant satellite kingdom of Lazica near the Black Sea as requested by its discontented king Gubazes, exacting tribute from the towns he passed along his way. He forced Justinian I to pay him 5,000 pounds of gold, plus 500 pounds of gold more each year.

Belisarius arrived in the East in 541, but after some success, was again recalled to Constantinople in 542. The reasons for his withdrawal are not known, but it may have been instigated by rumours of his disloyalty reaching the court. The outbreak of the plague coupled with a rebellion in Persia brought Khosrow I's offensives to a halt. Exploiting this, Justinian ordered all the forces in the East to invade Persian Armenia, but the 30,000-strong Byzantine force was defeated by a small force at Anglon. The next year, Khosrau unsuccessfully besieged the major city of Edessa. Both parties made little headway, and in 545 a truce was agreed upon for the southern part of the Roman-Persian frontier. After that, the Lazic War in the North continued for several years: the Lazic king switched to the Byzantine side, and in 549 Justinian sent Dagisthaeus to recapture Petra, but he faced heavy resistance and the siege was relieved by Sasanian reinforcements. Justinian replaced him with Bessas, who was under a cloud after the loss of Rome in 546, but he managed to capture and dismantle Petra in 551. The war continued for several years until a second truce in 557, followed by a fifty years' peace in 562. Under its terms, the Persians agreed to abandon Lazica in exchange for an annual tribute of 400 or 500 pounds of gold (30,000 solidi) to be paid by the Romans.

==== War in Italy, second phase, 541–554 ====
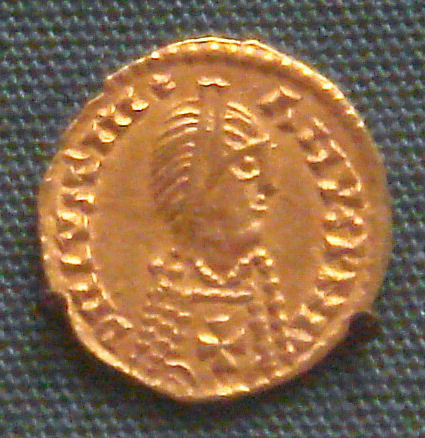
Spanish Visigothic gold Tremissis in the name of emperor Justinian I, 7th century. The Christian cross on the breast defines the Visigothic attribution. British Museum.

While military efforts were directed to the East, the situation in Italy took a turn for the worse. Under their respective kings Ildibad and Eraric (both murdered in 541) and especially Totila, the Ostrogoths made quick gains. After a victory at Faenza in 542, they reconquered the major cities of Southern Italy and soon held almost the entire Italian Peninsula. Belisarius was sent back to Italy late in 544 but lacked sufficient troops and supplies. Making no headway, he was relieved of his command in 548. Belisarius succeeded in defeating a Gothic fleet of 200 ships. During this period the city of Rome changed hands three more times, first taken and depopulated by the Ostrogoths in December 546, then reconquered by the Byzantines in 547, and then again by the Goths in January 550. Totila also plundered Sicily and attacked Greek coastlines.

Finally, Justinian dispatched a force of approximately 35,000 men (2,000 men were detached and sent to invade southern Visigothic Hispania) under the command of Narses. The army reached Ravenna in June 552 and defeated the Ostrogoths decisively within a month at the battle of Busta Gallorum in the Apennines, where Totila was slain. After a second battle at Mons Lactarius in October that year, the resistance of the Ostrogoths was finally broken. In 554, a large-scale Frankish invasion was defeated at Casilinum, and Italy was secured for the empire, though it would take Narses several years to reduce the remaining Gothic strongholds. At the end of the war, Italy was garrisoned with an army of 16,000 men. The recovery of Italy cost the empire about 300,000 pounds of gold.

==== Other campaigns ====
In addition to the other conquests, the Empire established a presence in Visigothic Hispania, when the usurper Athanagild requested assistance in his rebellion against King Agila I. In 552, Justinian dispatched a force of 2,000 men; according to the historian Jordanes, this army was led by the octogenarian Liberius. The Byzantines took Cartagena and other cities on the southeastern coast and founded the new province of Spania before being checked by their former ally Athanagild, who had by now become king. This campaign marked the apogee of Byzantine expansion.

During Justinian's reign, the Balkans suffered from several incursions by the Turkic and Slavic peoples who lived north of the Danube. Here, Justinian resorted mainly to a combination of diplomacy and a system of defensive works. In 559 a particularly dangerous invasion of Sklavinoi and Kutrigurs under their khan Zabergan threatened Constantinople, but they were repulsed by the aged general Belisarius.

During the first year of his reign, 527, Justinian conquered the Khaskuns (Circassian) people. When the Khaskuns led an uprising against Byzantine in 549 to 550, he sent a Laz army, led by general Parsman, and invaded the Khaskuns, re-establishing his dominance in the Caucasus. He spread Christianity among the Circassians and the people treated him with great respect. They attempted the Olympic Games, and fought alongside Byzantines against the Goths. The Circassians called Justinian the "Adyghe Knight".

==== Results ====
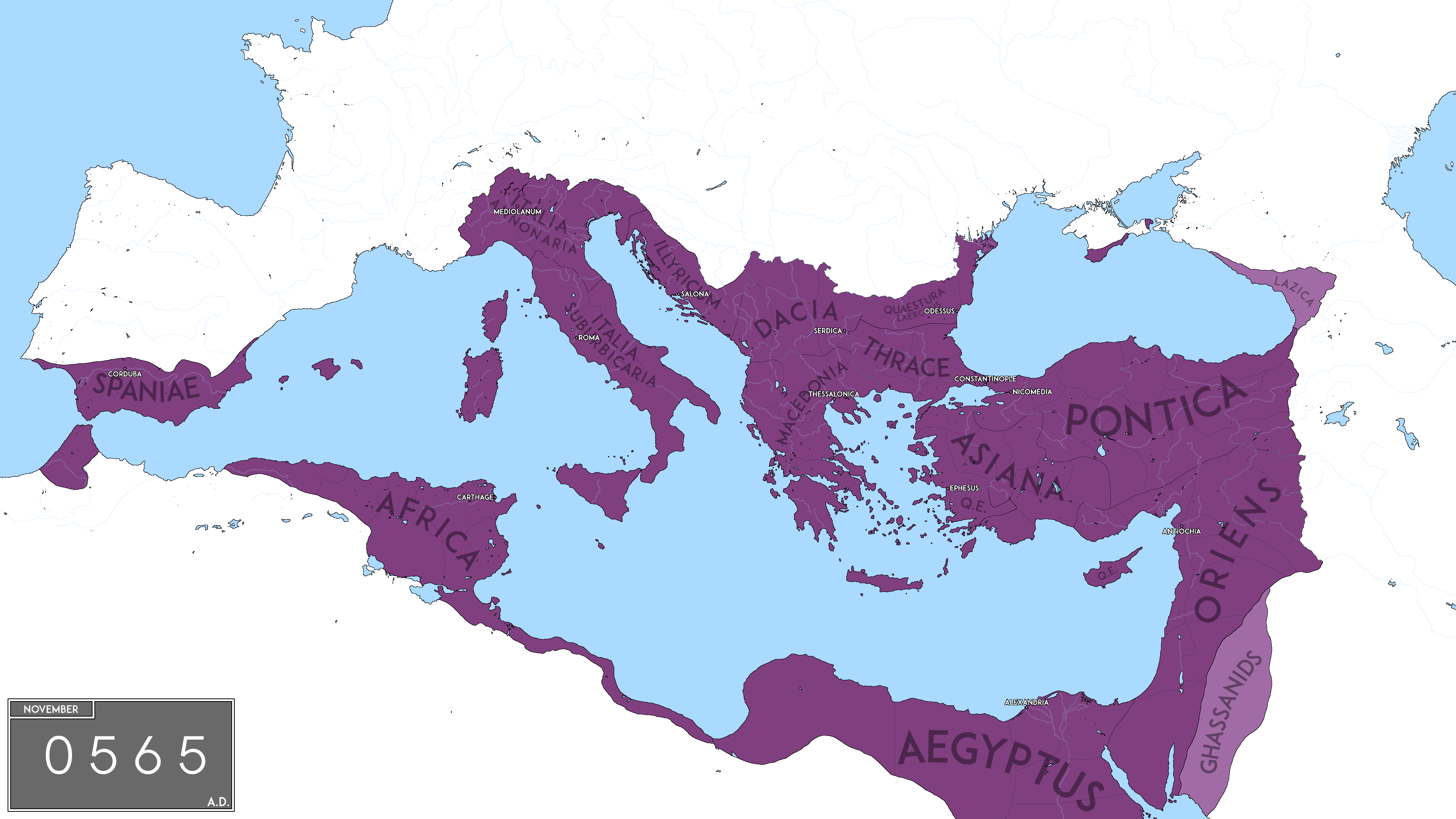
The Byzantine Empire at its greatest extent since the fall of the Western Roman Empire, under Justinian I in 565 AD. Emperor Justinian reconquered many former territories of the Western Roman Empire, including Italia, Dalmatia, Africa, and southern Hispania.

Justinian's ambition for re-conquest was only partly realized, with the only lasting and sustainable conquests being Africa and Sicily. In the West, the early military successes of the 530s were followed by years of stagnation. The dragging war with the Goths was a disaster for Italy, even though its long-lasting effects may have been less severe than is sometimes thought. The heavy taxes that the administration imposed upon the Italian population were deeply resented.

The final victory in Italy and the conquest of Africa and the coast of southern Hispania significantly enlarged the area of Byzantine influence and eliminated all naval threats to the empire, which in 555 reached its territorial zenith. Despite losing much of Italy soon after Justinian's death, the empire retained several important cities, including Rome, Naples, and Ravenna, leaving the Lombards as a regional threat. The newly founded province of Spania kept the Visigoths as a threat to Hispania alone and not to the western Mediterranean and Africa.

Events of the later years of his reign showed that Constantinople itself was not safe from barbarian incursions from the north, and even the relatively benevolent historian Menander Protector felt the need to attribute the Emperor's failure to protect the capital to the weakness of his body in his old age. Some historians view that in his efforts to renew the Roman Empire, Justinian dangerously stretched its resources while failing to take into account the changed realities of 6th-century Europe.

With regard to the long term consequences of Justinian's conquests, the provinces of Italy, North Africa and Spain were some of the wealthiest provinces of the Roman Empire, and thus it would not be unreasonable to assume that those provinces would make a substantial contribution to the empire's coffers given that these provinces were highly taxable. Peter Sarris suggests that Justinian's efforts were hampered by the plague and as a result it made reconquering the West harder and costlier. According to some historians, despite the scale of destruction caused by the conquests, North Africa and Southern Italy generally paid for themselves and yielded substantial profit for the empire. The conquests in the West also expanded Byzantine influence over the papacy and added a source of Germanic warriors for recruitment in the army.

=== Religious activities ===
Justinian saw the orthodoxy of his empire threatened by diverging religious currents, especially miaphysitism, which had many adherents in the eastern provinces of Syria and Egypt. Miaphysitism rejected the Council of Chalcedon in 451, which ruled that Jesus Christ has two natures (one divine and one human), instead maintaining that he has one nature that is both fully divine and fully human. The tolerant policies towards Miaphysitism of Zeno and Anastasius I had been a source of tension in the relationship with the bishops of Rome.

Justin reversed this trend and confirmed the Chalcedonian doctrine, openly condemning the Miaphysites. Justinian, who continued this policy, tried to impose religious unity on his subjects by forcing them to accept doctrinal compromises that might appeal to all parties, a policy that proved unsuccessful as he satisfied none of them.

The empress Theodora, herself a Miaphysite, sympathized with the Miaphysites and was accused of being a constant source of pro-Miaphysite intrigues at the court in Constantinople in the earlier years. In the course of his reign, Justinian, who had a genuine interest in matters of theology, authored a small number of theological treatises.

==== Religious policy ====
As in his secular administration, despotism appeared also in the Emperor's ecclesiastical policy. At the very beginning of his reign, he enacted into law the Church's belief in the Trinity and the Incarnation. That law provided punishment for heresy, but he subsequently granted accused heretics due process of law. He made the Nicaeno-Constantinopolitan creed the official doctrine of the Church and granted legal force to the canons of the four ecumenical councils. The bishops in attendance at the Council of Constantinople (536) recognized that nothing could be done in the Church contrary to the emperor's will and command, while, on his side, the emperor, in the case of the Patriarch Anthimus, reinforced the ban of the Church with temporal proscription. Justinian protected the purity of the church by suppressing heretics. He missed no opportunity to secure the rights of the Church and the clergy, nor to protect and extend monasticism. He granted monks the right to inherit property from private citizens and the right to receive solemnia, or annual gifts, from the imperial treasury or from the taxes of certain provinces and he prohibited lay confiscation of monastic estates.

Throughout his reign Justinian promoted Archangel Michael as imperial archistratēgos, advancing the cult of Michael both directly and indirectly. He included Archangel Michael in imperial oaths, liturgical commemorations, and imperial iconography, and he built churches in Michael's honour. In doing so, Justinian reinforced his own legitimacy.

Both the Codex and the Novellae contain many enactments regarding donations, foundations, and the administration of ecclesiastical property; election and rights of bishops, priests and abbots; monastic life, residential obligations of the clergy, conduct of divine service, episcopal jurisdiction, etc. Justinian also rebuilt the Church of Hagia Sophia (which cost 20,000 pounds of gold), the original site having been destroyed during the Nika riots. The new Hagia Sophia, with its numerous chapels and shrines, gilded octagonal dome, and mosaics, became the Eastern Roman Empire's space of identification.

==== Religious relations with Rome ====
Justinian entered the arena of ecclesiastical conflicts shortly after his uncle's accession in 518, and put an end to the Acacian schism. Previous Emperors had tried to alleviate theological conflicts by declarations that deemphasized the Council of Chalcedon, which had condemned miaphysitism, which had strongholds in Egypt and Syria, and by tolerating the appointment of Miaphysites to church offices. The Popes reacted by severing ties with the Patriarch of Constantinople who supported these policies. Emperors Justin I (and later Justinian himself) rescinded these policies and re-established the union between Constantinople and Rome. After this, Justinian also felt entitled to settle disputes in papal elections, as he did when he favored Vigilius and had his rival Silverius deported.

This new-found unity between East and West did not, however, solve the ongoing disputes in the east. Justinian's policies switched between attempts to force Miaphysites to accept the Chalcedonian creed by persecuting their bishops and monks – thereby embittering their sympathizers in Egypt and other provinces – and attempts at a compromise that would win over the Miaphysites without surrendering the Chalcedonian faith. Such an approach was supported by the Empress Theodora, who favoured the Miaphysites unreservedly. In the condemnation of the Three Chapters, three theologians that had opposed Miaphysitism before and after the Council of Chalcedon, Justinian tried to win over the opposition. At the Fifth Ecumenical Council, most of the Eastern church yielded to the Emperor's demands, and Pope Vigilius, who was forcibly brought to Constantinople and besieged at a chapel, finally also gave his assent. However, the condemnation was received unfavourably in the west, where it led to new (albeit temporal) schism, and failed to reach its goal in the east, as the Miaphysites remained unsatisfied – all the more bitter for him because during his last years he took an even greater interest in theological matters.

==== Authoritarian rule ====
Justinian's religious policy reflected the conviction that the unity of the empire presupposed unity of faith under the Chalcedonian Church. Those of different beliefs were subjected to persecution, which imperial legislation had effected from the time of Constantius II and which would continue under Justinian. The Codex Justinianus contained laws restricting pagan practices, even in private life; these provisions were enforced. Contemporary sources describe severe persecutions, including against high-ranking officials.

The original Academy of Plato had been destroyed by the Roman dictator Sulla in 86 BC. A later Neoplatonic Academy in Athens existed without institutional continuity with Plato's original school and functioned as a center for Neoplatonism. It was closed in 529 AD by Justinian I. Other schools in Constantinople, Antioch, and Alexandria continued to operate.

In Asia Minor alone, John of Ephesus was reported to have converted 70,000 pagans, likely an exaggerated figure. Other peoples also accepted Christianity: the Heruli, the Huns near the Don River, the Abasgians, and the Lazs in Caucasia.

The worship of Amun at the oasis of Awjila in the Libyan desert was abolished, and so were the remnants of the worship of Isis on the island of Philae, at the first cataract of the Nile. The Presbyter Julian and the Bishop Longinus conducted missions among the Nabataeans, and Justinian attempted to strengthen Christianity in Yemen by sending a bishop from Egypt.

Jews (alongside heretics) were not permitted to testify against Christians. Justinian also made it so that if the Passover fell before a Christian feast, he would not allow the Jews to celebrate this at the proper time nor to make any offering to God at that feast nor to perform any of the rites customary among them. Justinian also interfered in synagogue affairs and encouraged the use of the Greek Septuagint in Constantinople.

The Emperor faced opposition from the Samaritans, who resisted conversion and repeatedly revolted. He imposed strict edicts, including banning them from making wills in 529, an act of legal humiliation. He could not prevent reprisals against Christians in Samaria toward the end of his reign.

The Manicheans also suffered persecution, including exile and capital punishment. In Constantinople, around 450, several Manicheans were executed by burning after interrogation.

=== Architecture, learning, art and literature ===
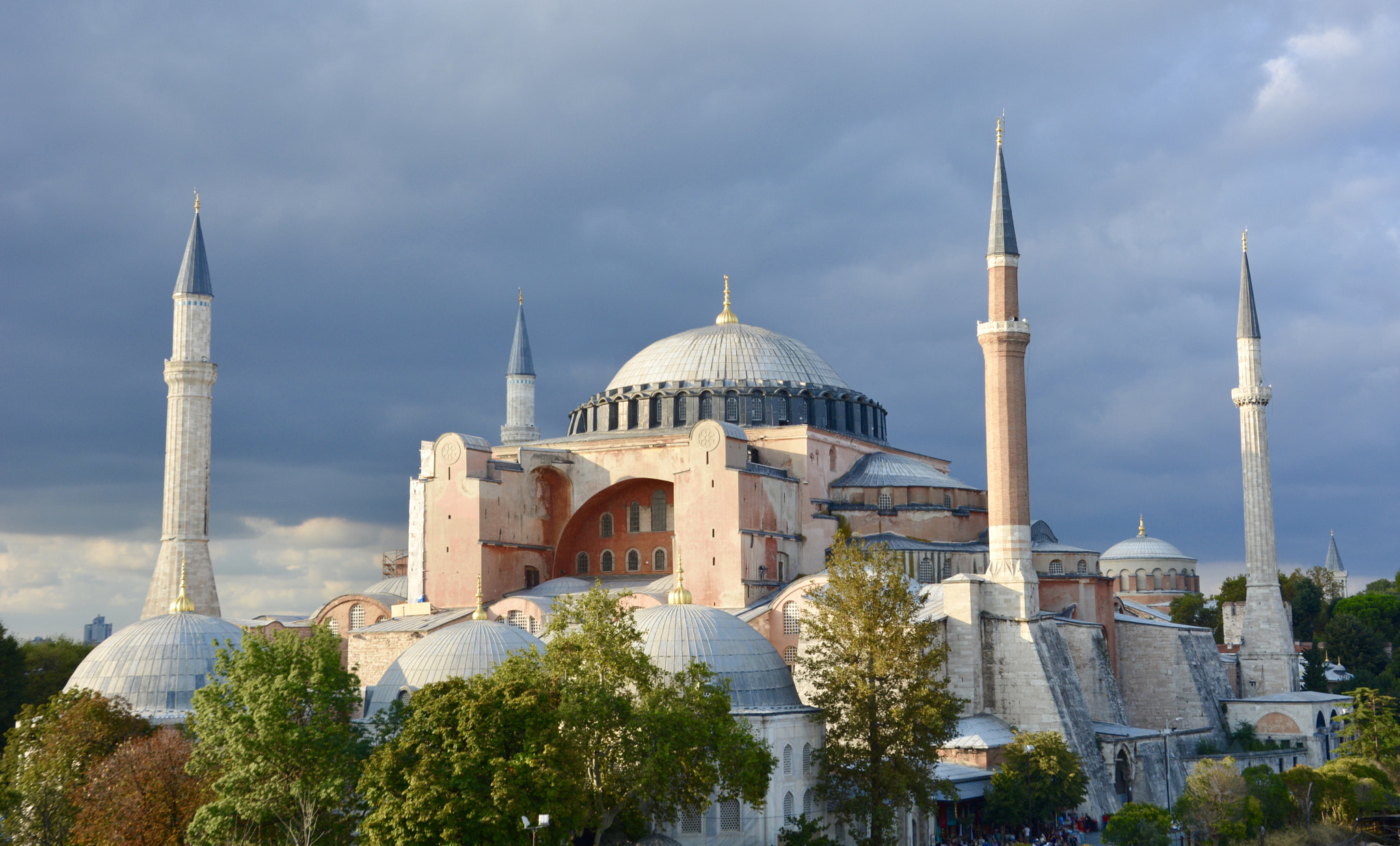
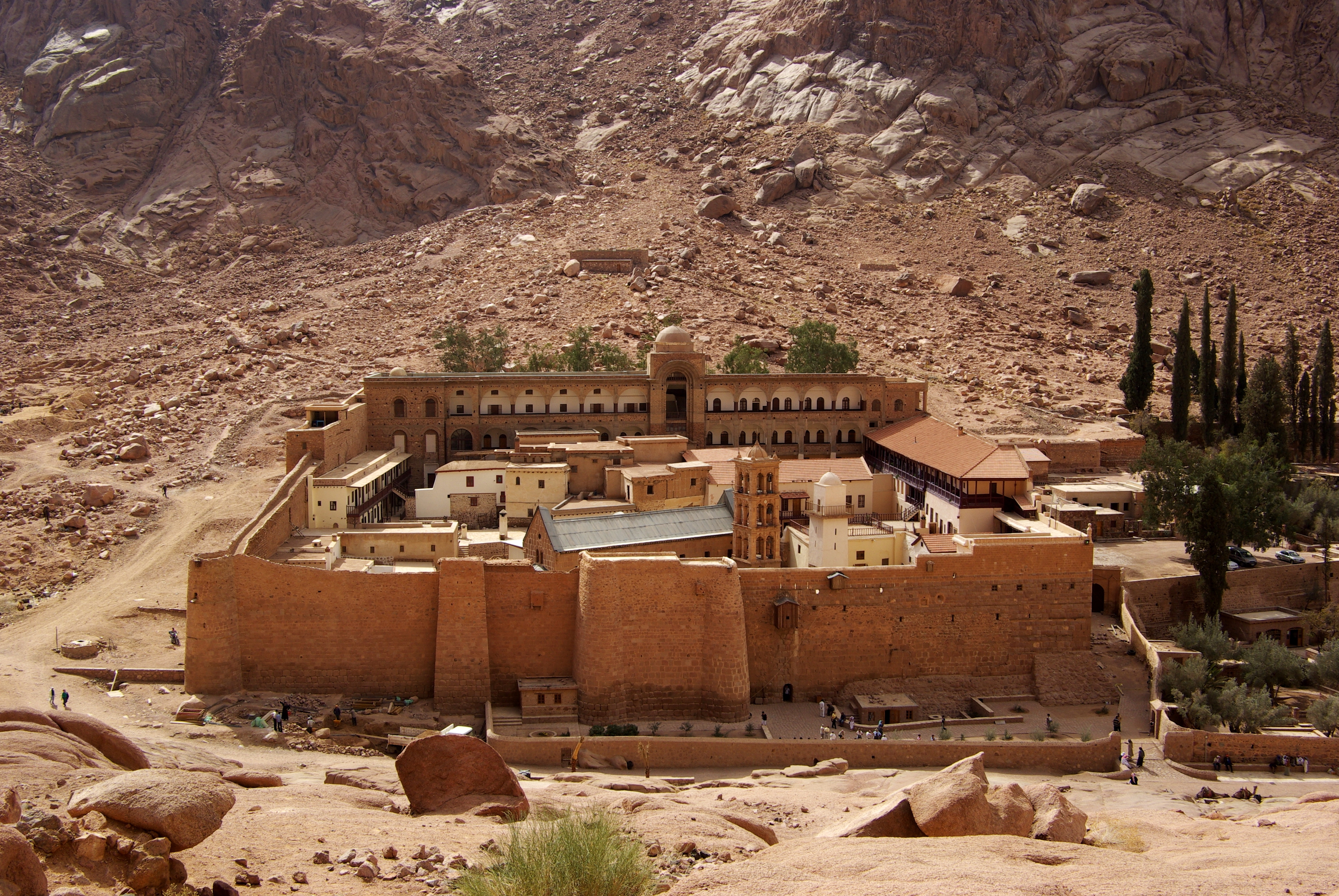
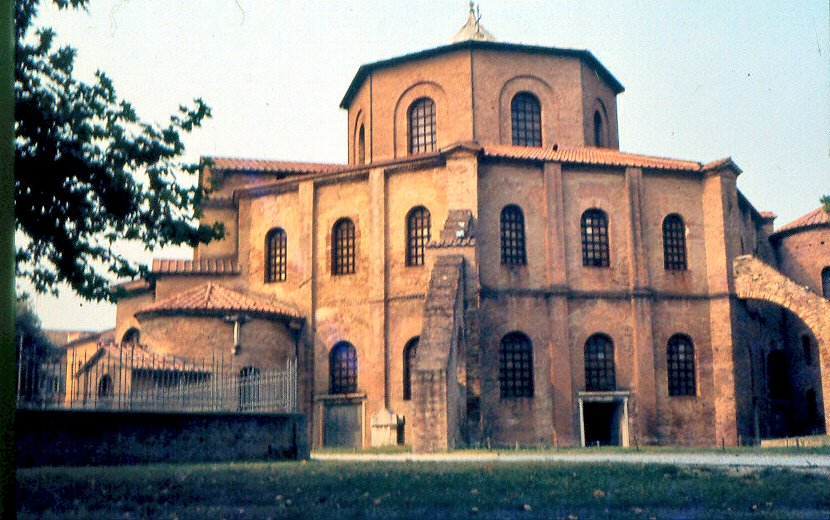
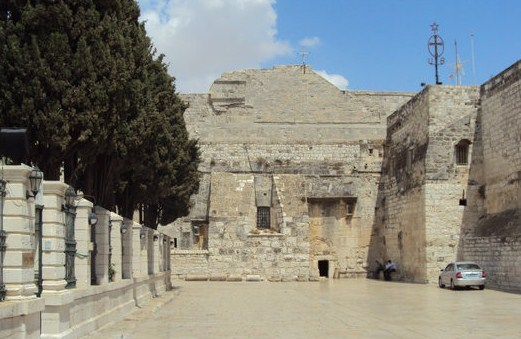
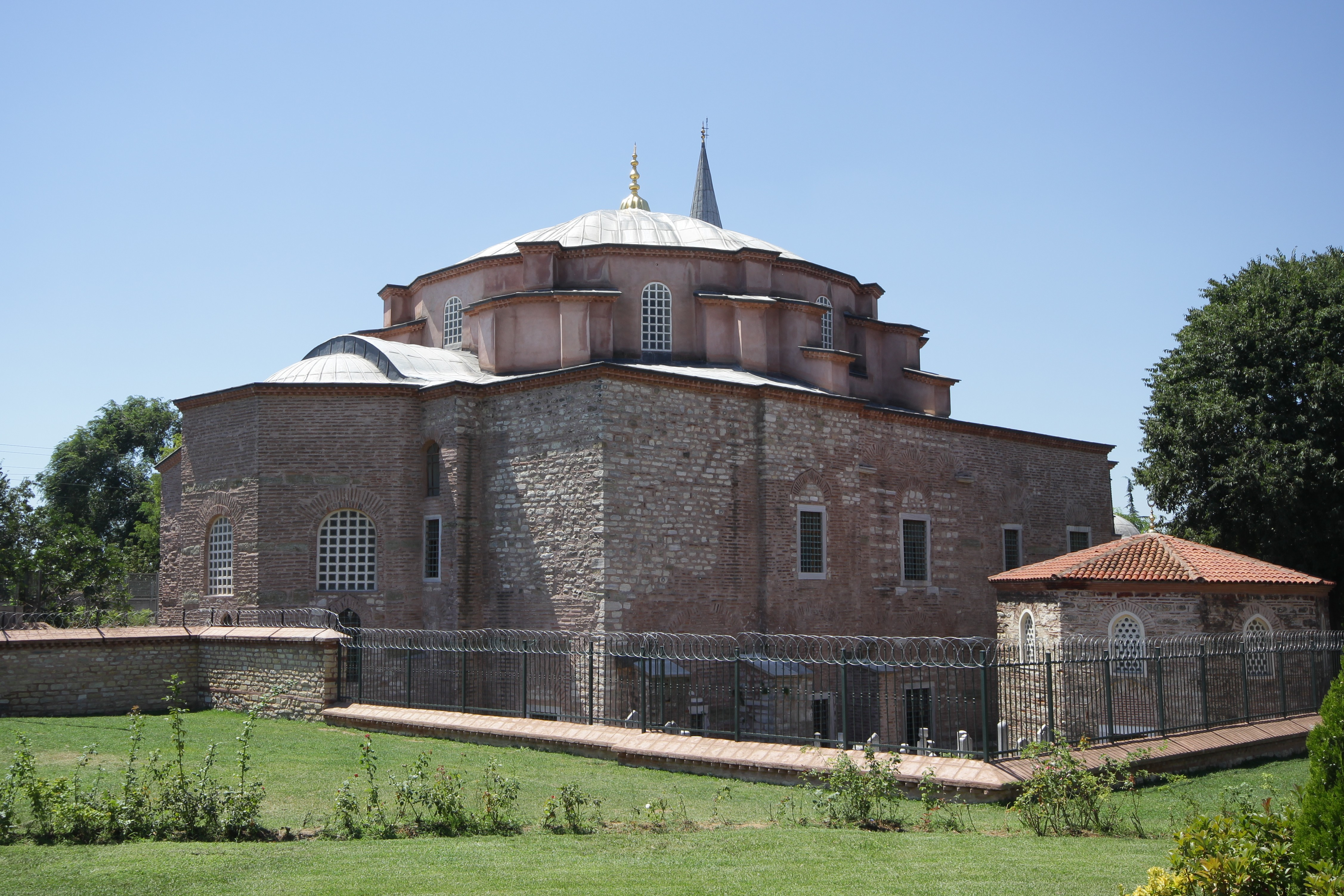
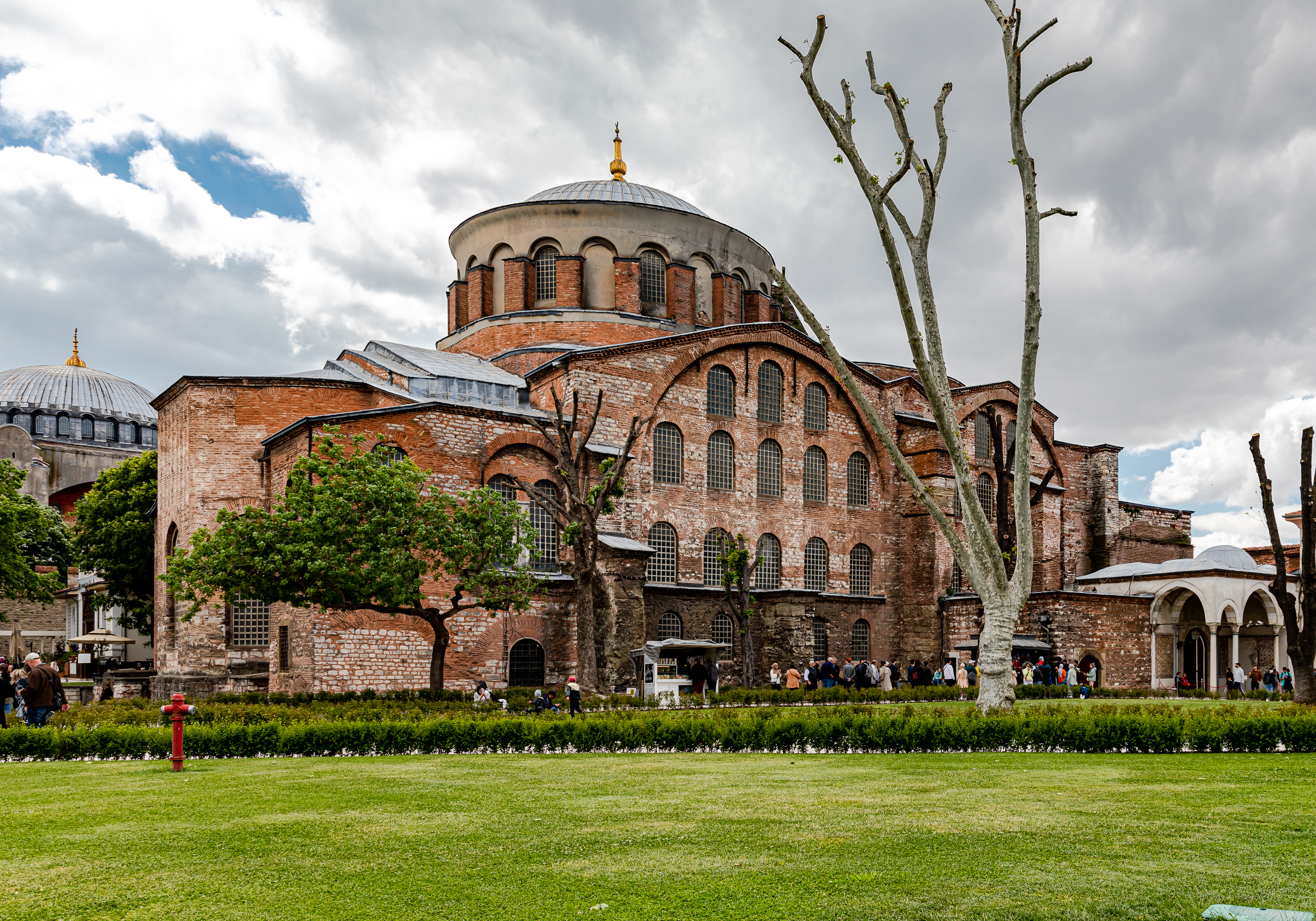
Six of the many churches built by Justinian. Clockwise from top left: The Hagia Sophia, Saint Catherine's Monastery, the Church of the Nativity, the Hagia Irene, the Little Hagia Sophia, and the Basilica of San Vitale

Justinian's reputation as a prolific builder is attested in the works of Procopius, Paul the Silentiary, John Malalas and Pseudo-Zacharias Rhetor. Under Justinian's reign, the San Vitale in Ravenna, which features two famous mosaics representing Justinian and Theodora, was completed under the sponsorship of Julius Argentarius. Most notably, he had the Hagia Sophia, originally a basilica-style church that had been burnt down during the Nika riots, splendidly rebuilt according to a completely different ground plan, under the architectural supervision of Isidore of Miletus and Anthemius of Tralles. On 26 December 537, according to Pseudo-Codinus, Justinian stated at the completion of this edifice: "Solomon, I have outdone thee" (in reference to the first Jewish temple). The church had a second inauguration on 24 December 562, after several reworks made by Isidore the Younger. This new cathedral, with its magnificent dome filled with mosaics, remained the centre of eastern Christianity for centuries.

Another prominent church in the capital, the Church of the Holy Apostles, which had been in a very poor state near the end of the 5th century, was likewise rebuilt. The Church of Saints Sergius and Bacchus, later renamed Little Hagia Sophia, was also built between 532 and 536 by the imperial couple. Works of embellishment were not confined to churches alone: excavations at the site of the Great Palace of Constantinople have yielded several high-quality mosaics dating from Justinian's reign, and a column topped by a bronze statue of Justinian on horseback and dressed in a military costume was erected in the Augustaeum in Constantinople in 543. Rivalry with other, more established patrons from the Constantinopolitan and exiled Roman aristocracy might have enforced Justinian's building activities in the capital as a means of strengthening his dynasty's prestige.

Justinian also strengthened the borders of the Empire from Africa to the East through the construction of fortifications and ensured Constantinople of its water supply through construction of underground cisterns (see Basilica Cistern). To prevent floods from damaging the strategically important border town Dara, an advanced arch dam was built. During his reign the large Sangarius Bridge was built in Bithynia, securing a major military supply route to the east. Furthermore, Justinian restored cities damaged by earthquake or war and built a new city near his place of birth called Justiniana Prima, which was intended to replace Thessalonica as the political and religious centre of Illyricum.

In Justinian's reign, and partly under his patronage, Byzantine culture produced noteworthy historians, including Procopius and Agathias, and poets such as Paul the Silentiary and Romanus the Melodist flourished. On the other hand, centres of learning such as the Neoplatonic Academy in Athens and the famous Law School of Berytus lost their importance during his reign.

=== Economy and administration ===
As was the case under Justinian's predecessors, the empire was an agrarian-based economy. In addition, long-distance trade flourished, reaching as far north as Cornwall where tin was exchanged for Roman wheat. Within the empire, convoys sailing from Alexandria provided Constantinople with wheat and grains. Justinian made the traffic more efficient by building a large granary on the island of Tenedos for storage and further transport to Constantinople. Justinian also tried to find new routes for the eastern trade, which was suffering badly from the wars with the Persians.

Silk was an important luxury product, which was imported and then processed in the empire. In order to protect the manufacture of silk products, Justinian granted a monopoly to the imperial factories in 541. In order to bypass the Persian landroute, Justinian established friendly relations with the Abyssinians, whom he wanted to act as trade mediators by transporting Indian silk to the empire; the Abyssinians, however, were unable to compete with the Persian merchants in India. Then, in the early 550s, two monks succeeded in smuggling eggs of silk worms from Central Asia back to Constantinople, and silk became an indigenous product.

Gold and silver were mined in the Balkans, Anatolia, Armenia, Cyprus, Egypt and Nubia. At the start of Justinian I's reign, he had inherited a surplus 28,800,000 solidi (400,000 pounds of gold) in the imperial treasury from Anastasius I and Justin I. Under Justinian's rule, measures were taken to counter corruption in the provinces and to make tax collection more efficient. Greater administrative power was given to both the leaders of the prefectures and of the provinces, while power was taken away from the vicariates of the dioceses, of which a number were abolished. The overall trend was towards a simplification of administrative infrastructure. According to Brown (1971), the increased professionalization of tax collection did much to destroy the traditional structures of provincial life, as it weakened the autonomy of the town councils in the Greek towns. Other anti-corruption measures include cracking down on illegal fees and bribes taken by government officials, and standardising how provincial governors were appointed, which also required them to take an oath to remain honest. The emperor also ensured that new governors prioritised tax collection, and made it easier for provincials to undertake legal action against former governors after their terms had ended. It has been estimated that before Justinian I's reconquests the state had an annual revenue of 5,000,000 solidi in AD 530, but after his reconquests, the annual revenue was increased to 6,000,000 solidi in AD 550.

Throughout Justinian's reign, the cities and villages of the East thrived, although Antioch was struck by two earthquakes (526, 528) and sacked and evacuated by the Persians (540). Justinian had the city rebuilt, but on a slightly smaller scale. His reconstruction included the construction of the Iron Gate, a still-active arch dam integrated into the city wall which protected the city from seasonal floods.

The empire suffered several major setbacks in the course of the 6th century. The first one was the plague, which lasted from 541 to 543 and, by decreasing the empire's population, probably created a scarcity of labor and a rising of wages. It has been proposed that the lack of manpower also led to a significant increase in the number of "barbarians" in the Byzantine armies after the early 540s, but others are skeptical of this view. The protracted war in Italy and the wars with the Persians themselves laid a heavy burden on the empire's resources, and Justinian was criticized for curtailing the government-run post service, which he limited to only one eastern route of military importance.

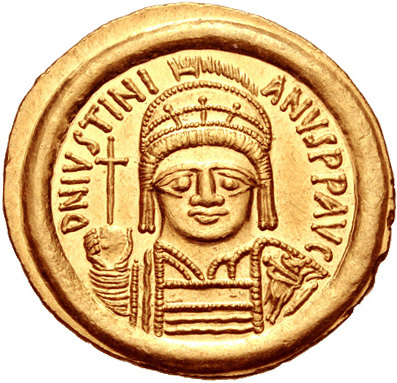
Gold coin of Justinian minted in Ravenna.

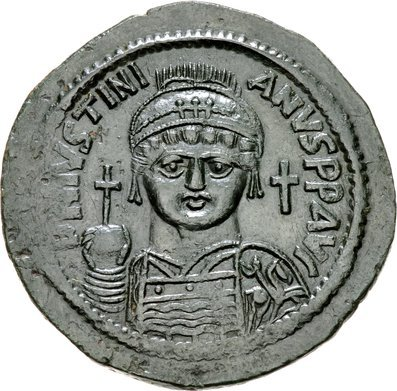
Follis of Justinian minted in Nicomedia.

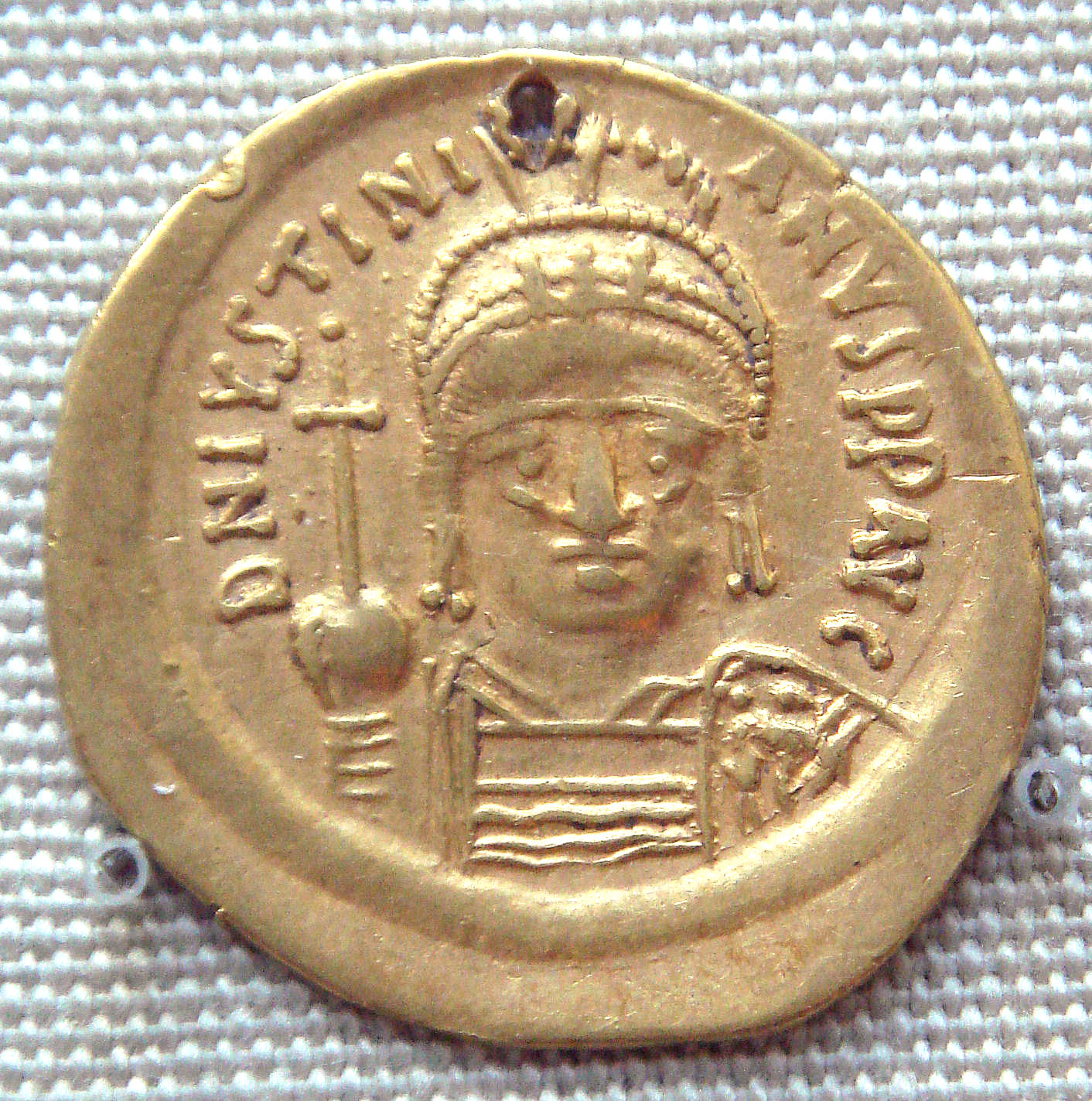
Gold coin of Justinian I (527–565) excavated in India probably in the south, an example of Indo-Roman trade during the period

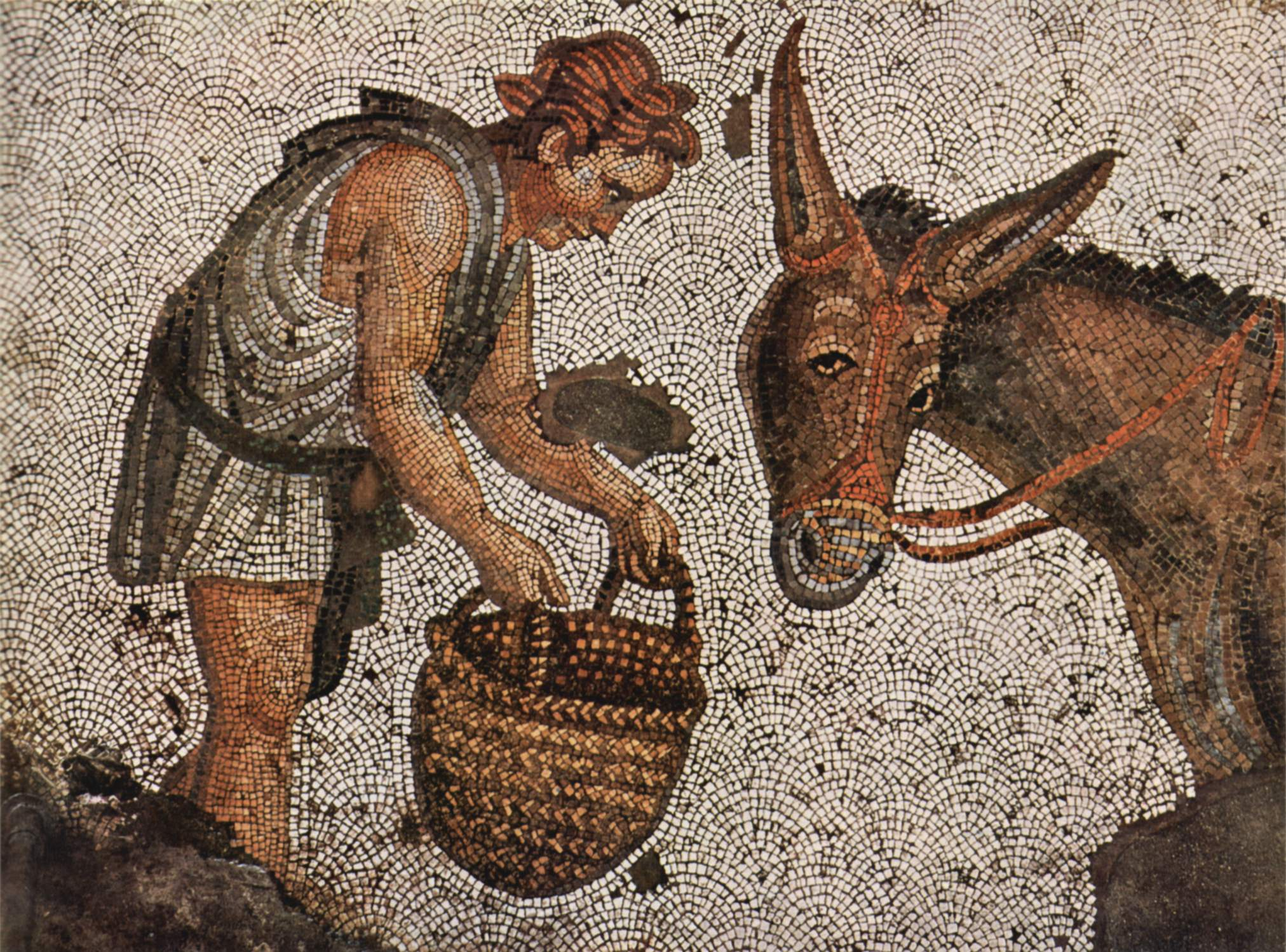
Scene from daily life on a mosaic from the Great Palace of Constantinople, early 6th century

=== Death ===
Justinian spent his final years marked by increasing isolation and reliance on a small circle of advisors, many of whom he had brought into the palace decades earlier. Although he grew increasingly intolerant in religious affairs, he became less ruthless in other respects. Following a major earthquake in December 557, he demonstrated his penitence by abstaining from wearing his crown for forty days and distributing imperial funds to the poor. In 562, when an assassination plot against him was uncovered, he gave clemency to the conspirators and pardoned Belisarius who was briefly implicated in the plot.

Justinian died in his sleep on the night of 14 November 565. News of his death quickly reached his nephew Justin, who hurried to the palace with his wife Sophia to secure the throne. Justinian was succeeded by Justin II. According to the court poet Corippus, Justinian's death was met with widespread public mourning before he was laid to rest in a tomb in the Church of the Holy Apostles.

== Natural disasters ==
The extreme weather events of 535–536 were felt in Europe, the Middle East, and China. The historian Procopius recorded in 536 in his work on the Vandalic War "during this year a most dread portent took place. For the sun gave forth its light without brightness ... and it seemed exceedingly like the sun in eclipse, for the beams it shed were not clear". These disasters may have been caused by an atmospheric dust veil resulting from a large volcanic eruption at the Rabaul caldera, Lake Ilopango, Krakatoa, or, according to a 2018 finding, in Iceland.

Seven years later in 542, an outbreak of Bubonic Plague, known as the Plague of Justinian, was traditionally believed to have killed tens of millions, making it second only to the Black Death of the 14th century. Justinian and members of his court were afflicted, with the emperor himself contracting and surviving the pestilence. However, recent research challenges this catastrophic narrative, arguing that contemporary primary sources overstated the disaster and that the plague's societal and demographic consequences were largely limited. Scholars remain divided over the pandemic's true demographic and societal impact.

In July 551, the Beirut earthquake struck the eastern Mediterranean and triggered a tsunami, causing widespread destruction.

== Historical sources ==
Contemporary sources include the writings of Procopius, John Malalas, John of Ephesus, Agathias, John the Lydian, Menander Protector, Evagrius Scholasticus, Pseudo-Zacharias Rhetor, Jordanes, Marcellinus Comes, Corippus and Victor of Tunnuna. The Paschal Chronicle and Theophanes the Confessor also provide accounts of his reign though written in a later period.

Procopius provides some of the primary sources for the history of Justinian's reign, although his works show a growing disillusionment and bitterness toward Justinian and his empress Theodora. While he glorified Justinian's architectural achievements in his panegyric (Buildings) and offered a more reserved account in his historical work (Wars), Procopius also wrote a hostile text, Anecdota (the so-called Secret History), in which Justinian is portrayed as cruel, corrupt, incompetent, and even demonic. The chronicle of John Malalas is another widely used source, offering a summary of the events of Justinian's reign; it generally reflects a more neutral to favorable perspective, emphasizing Justinian’s building activity, legislation, and piety.

== Veneration ==
Saint Justinian the Great
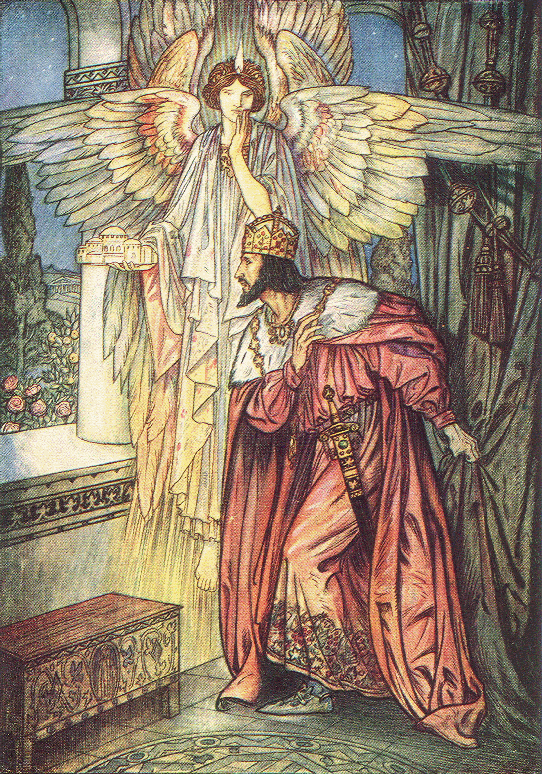
- Illustration of an angel showing Justinian a model of Hagia Sophia in a vision, by Herbert Cole (1912)

Emperor
- Venerated in: Eastern Orthodox Church; Greek Catholic Churches; Lutheranism
- Major shrine: Church of the Holy Apostles, Constantinople
- Feast: 14 November
- Attributes: Imperial Vestment

Justinian is widely regarded as a saint by Eastern Christians. In various Eastern Orthodox Churches, such as the Orthodox Church in America, Justinian and his empress Theodora are commemorated on the anniversary of his death, 14 November. In Eastern Churches that use the Julian calendar, the commemoration falls on 27 November. The Calendar of Saints of the Lutheran Church–Missouri Synod and the Lutheran Church–Canada also commemorate Justinian on 14 November.

== Cultural depictions ==
Poetry

- In the Paradiso section of the Divine Comedy, Canto (chapter) VI, by Dante Alighieri, Justinian I is prominently featured as a spirit residing on the sphere of Mercury. The latter holds in Heaven the souls of those whose acts were righteous, yet meant to achieve fame and honor. Justinian's legacy is elaborated on, and he is portrayed as a perfect ruler who was a defender of the Christian faith, a great lawgiver and the restorer of Rome to the Empire. Justinian confesses that he was partially motivated by fame rather than duty to God, which tainted the justice of his rule in spite of his proud accomplishments. In his introduction, "Cesare fui e son Iustinïano" ("Caesar I was, and am Justinian"), his mortal title is contrasted with his immortal soul, to emphasize that "glory in life is ephemeral, while contributing to God's glory is eternal", according to Dorothy L. Sayers. Dante also uses Justinian to criticize the factious politics of his 14th-century Italy, divided between Ghibellines and Guelphs, in contrast to the unified Italy of the Roman Empire.
- In the early 560s, Paul the Silentiary wrote a poem that praised the emperor and the Hagia Sophia.

Books

- Justinian is a chief protagonist of Belisarius in Empire in Apocalypse by Robert Bruton (Legend Books 2023), though the emperor's jealousy and envy of Belisarius eventually prompted him to undermine his best general.
- Justinian is a major character in the 1938 novel Count Belisarius, by Robert Graves. He is depicted as a jealous and conniving Emperor obsessed with creating and maintaining his own historical legacy.
- Justinian appears as a character in the 1939 time-travel novel Lest Darkness Fall, by L. Sprague de Camp.
- The Glittering Horn: Secret Memoirs of the Court of Justinian was a novel written by Pierson Dixon in 1958 about the court of Justinian.
- Justinian is featured in Stella Duffy's historical novel, Theodora: Actress, Empress, Whore which was published in 2010. Justinian and Theodora are portrayed as having a loving and effective partnership.
- Valerius II, a major character in Guy Gavriel Kay's book Sailing to Sarantium, was modelled on Justinian. He is portrayed as a powerful ruler, who worked for the good of his empire.

Films

- In the 1968 West German–Italian historical drama film The Last Roman (Kampf um Rom) Justinian is played by Orson Welles.
- In the 1985 Soviet film Primary Russia, Justinian is played by Innokenty Smoktunovsky.

Others

- Justinian occasionally appears in the comic strip Prince Valiant, usually as a nemesis of the title character.
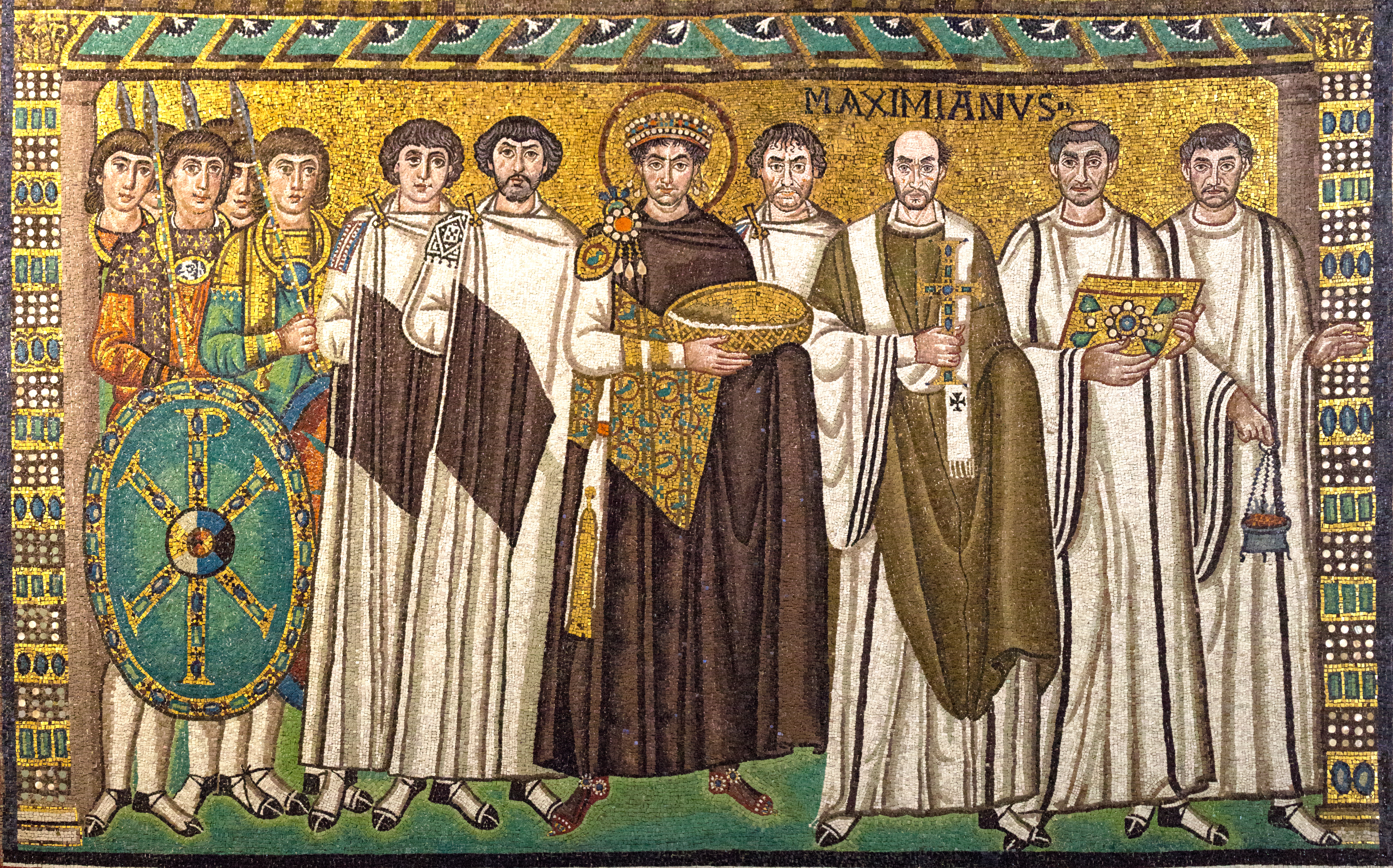
A 6th-century mosaic in Ravenna, showing Justinian with the bishop Maximianus, bodyguards, and courtiers.

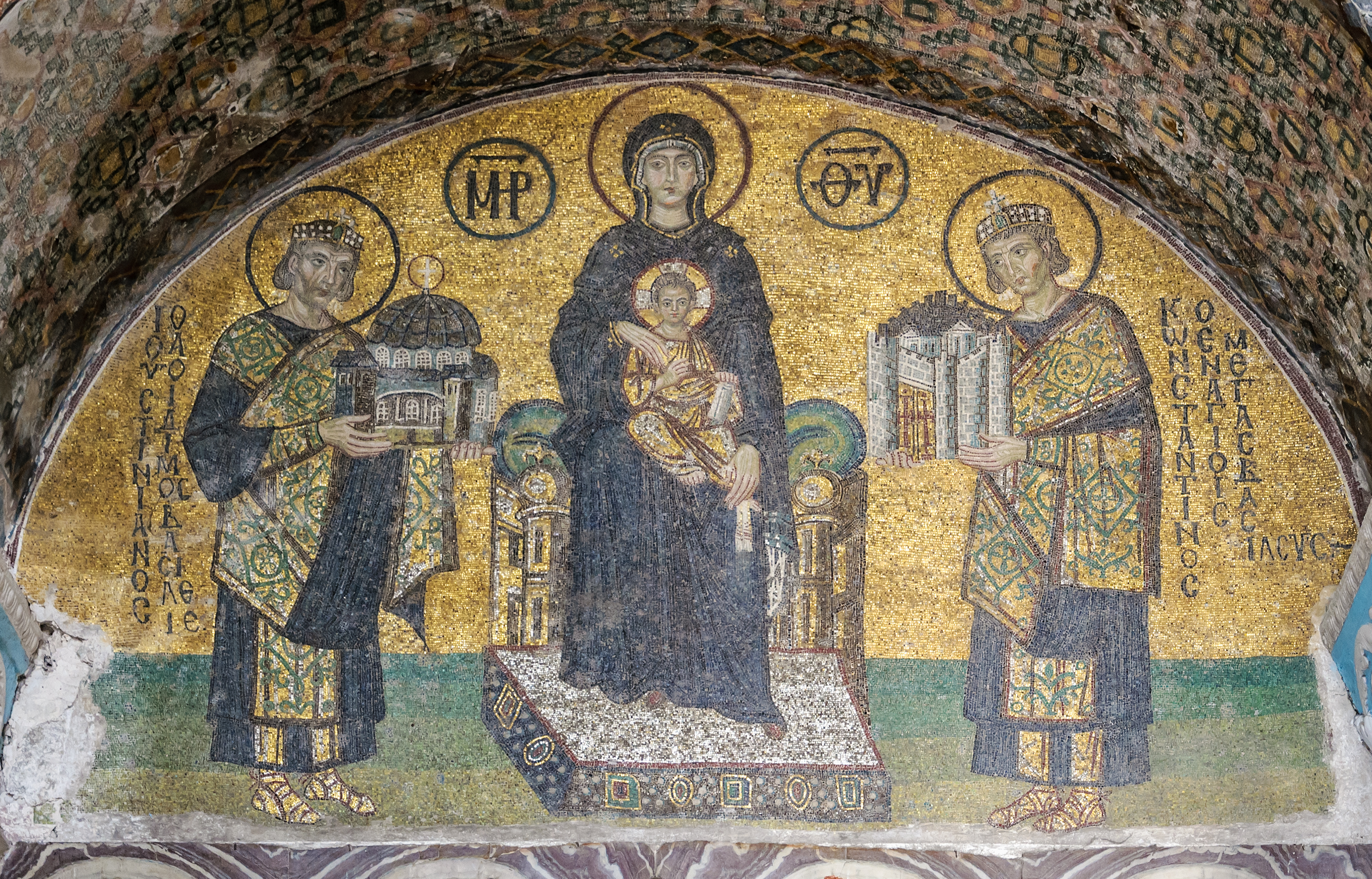
10th-century Hagia Sophia mosaic depicting the Virgin Mary holding Christ on her lap. On her right side stands Justinian, offering a model of the Hagia Sophia. On her left, Constantine I presents a model of Constantinople.

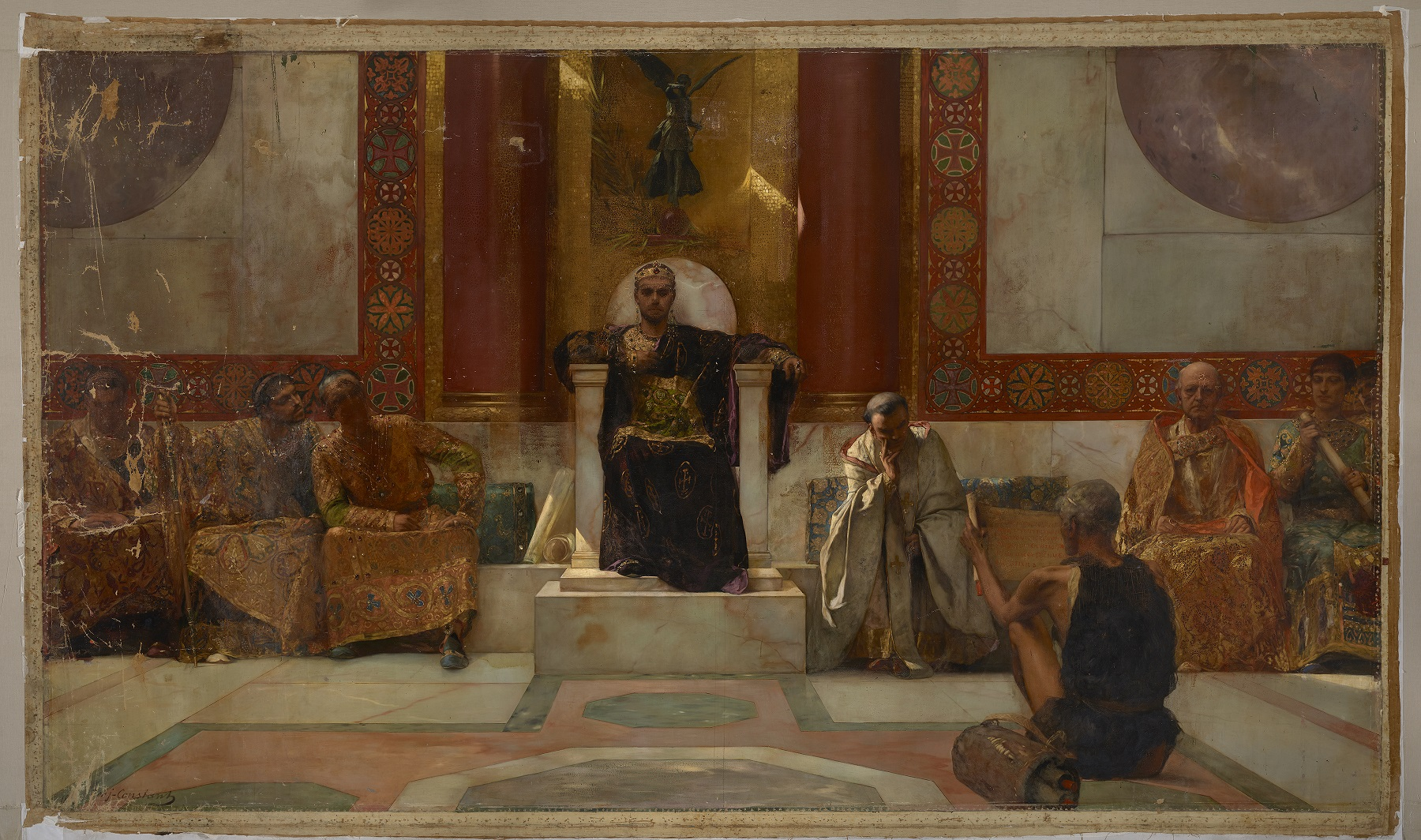
Emperor Justinian in Council (1886), by Jean-Joseph Benjamin-Constant, prior to restoration in 2020

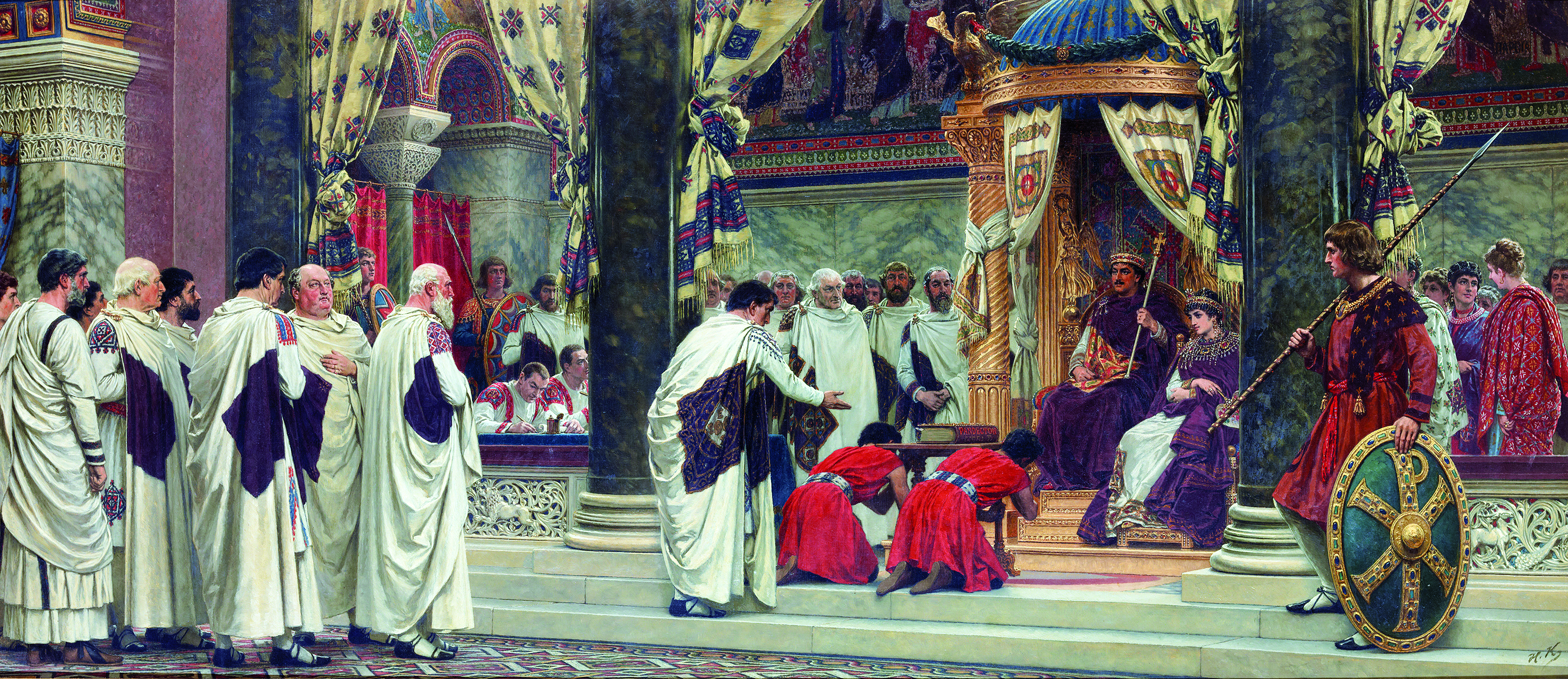
Presentation of the Pandects to Emperor Justinian (design for a mural in the Court building in Kassel, 1891) by Hermann Knackfuss

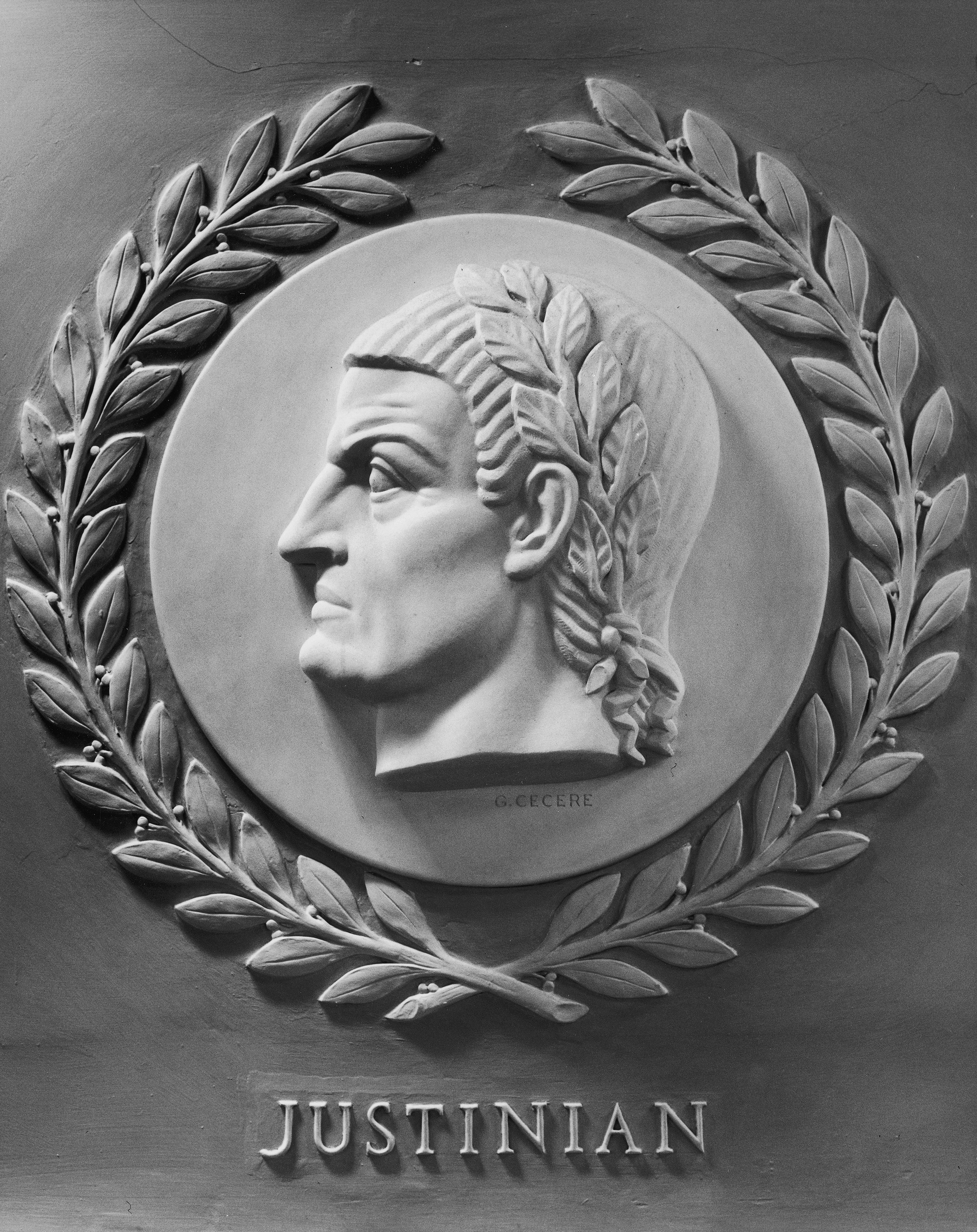
1950 relief of Justinian, one of a series of historical lawgivers' portraits in the United States Capitol

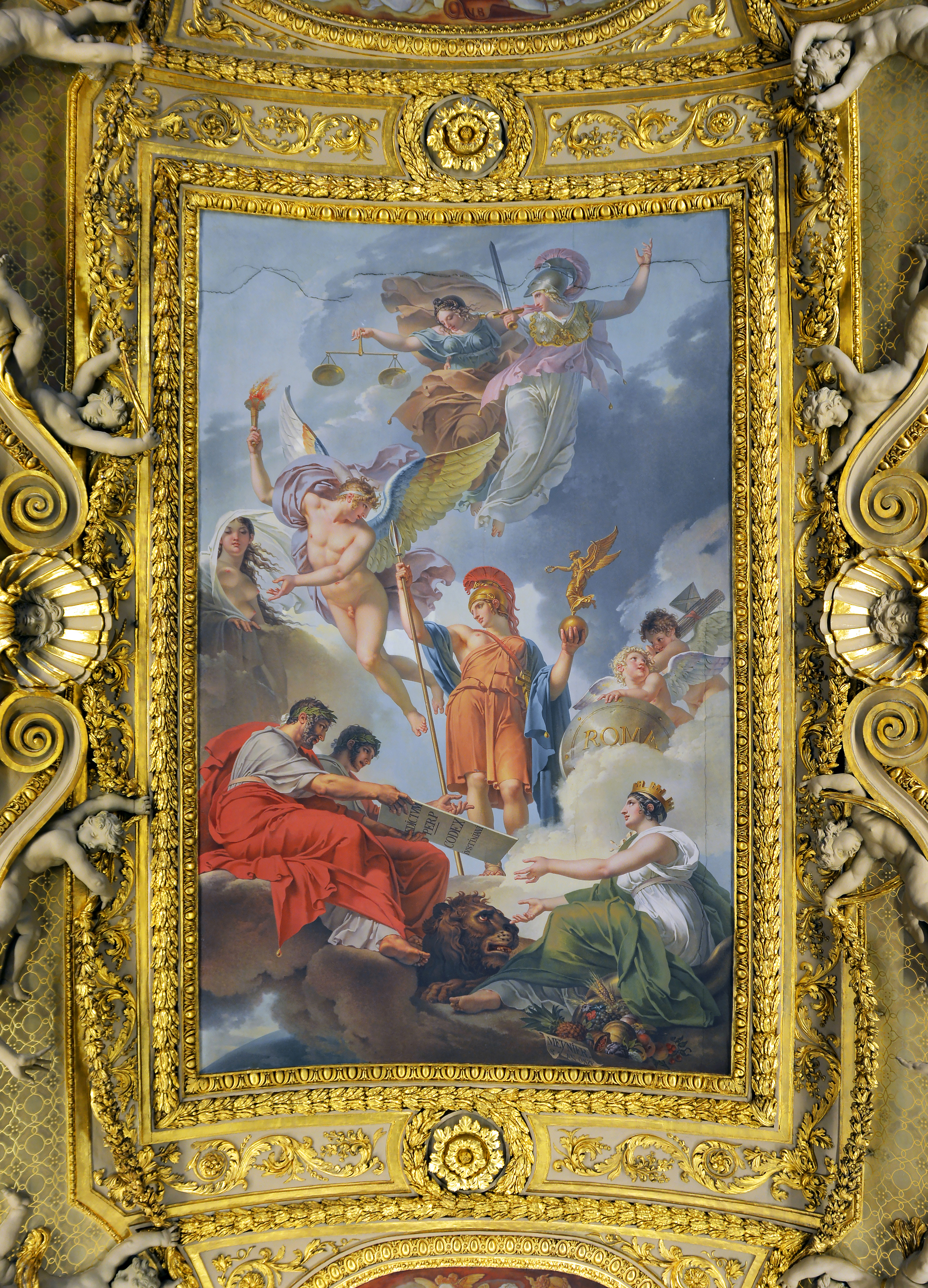
A painting depicting the Earth receiving the Codex of Roman law from the emperors Justinian and Hadrian. The painting was completed by French painter Charles Meynier in 1803.

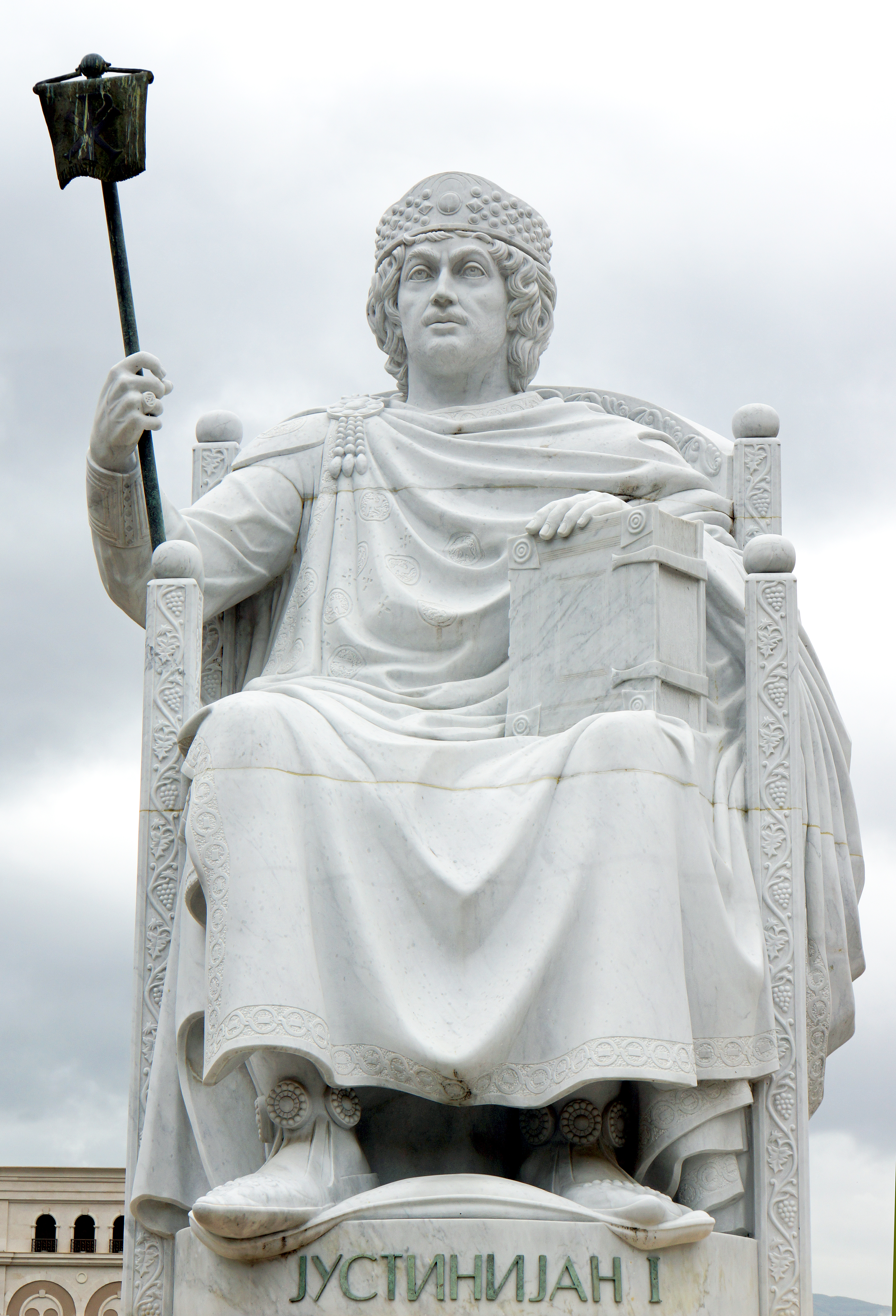
A statue of Justinian in Skopje, North Macedonia. Erected by the government under the "Skopje 2014" project, the statues aim to link North Macedonia to distinguished historical figures.

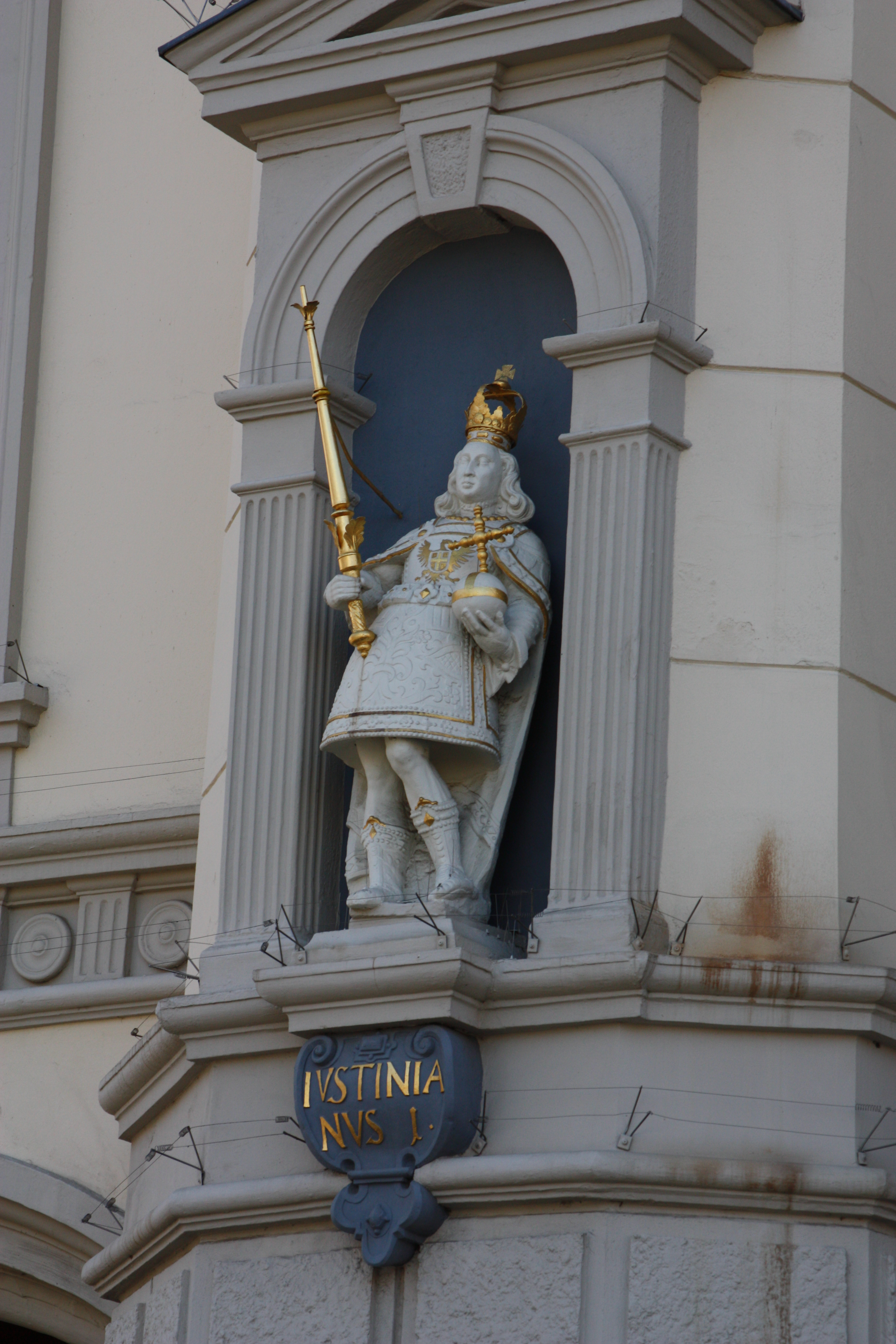
Several statues of prominent historical figures adorn the Lüneburg Town Hall in Germany, including Justinian, whose statue is pictured here.

== See also ==
- Church of the Nativity in Bethlehem, rebuilt by Justinian
- International Roman Law Moot Court

== Bibliography ==
- Barker, John W. (1966). Justinian and the Later Roman Empire. Madison: University of Wisconsin Press. ISBN 978-0299039448.
- Bury, J. B. (1958). History of the Later Roman Empire. Vol. 2 (Reprint ed.). New York: Dover Publications.
- Bury, J. B. (2012). History of the Later Roman Empire. Vol. 1. New York: Dover Publications. ISBN 9780486143385.
- Cameron, Averil; et al., eds. (29 March 2001). "Justinian Era". The Cambridge Ancient History. 14 (Second ed.). Cambridge. ISBN 9780521325912.
- Cumberland Jacobsen, Torsten (2009). The Gothic War. Westholme. ISBN 9781594160844.
- Dixon, Pierson (1958). The Glittering Horn: Secret Memoirs of the Court of Justinian.
- Evans, J. A. S. (1996). The Age of Justinian: The Circumstances of Imperial Power. Routledge. ISBN 978-0-415-02209-5.
- Evans, James Allan (2005). The Emperor Justinian and the Byzantine Empire. Westport, CT: Greenwood Press. ISBN 978-0-313-32582-3.
- Fisher, Greg (2021). The Roman World from Romulus to Muhammad: A New History. Routledge.
- Garland, Lynda (1999). Byzantine empresses: women and power in Byzantium, AD 527–1204. London: Routledge. ISBN 9781134756391.
- Haarer, Fiona K. (2022). Justinian: Empire and Society in the Sixth Century. Edinburgh University Press. ISBN 978-1-4744-8848-8.
- Maas, Michael, ed. (2005). The Cambridge Companion to the Age of Justinian. Cambridge: Cambridge University Press. ISBN 9781139826877.
- Martindale, J.R., ed. (1980). "Fl. Petrus Sabbatius Iustinianus 7". The Prosopography of the Later Roman Empire. Vol. II. pp. 645–648.
- Meier, Mischa (2003). Das andere Zeitalter Justinians. Kontingenz Erfahrung und Kontingenzbewältigung im 6. Jahrhundert n. Chr [The other age of Justinian: Experience of contingency and coping with contingency in the 6th century AD.] (in German). Gottingen. ISBN 9783666252464.
- Meier, Mischa (2004). Justinian. Herrschaft, Reich, und Religion [Justinian: Rule, Empire and Religion] (in German). Munich: CH Beck. ISBN 9783406508325.
- Meyendorff, John (1989). Imperial unity and Christian divisions: The Church 450–680 A.D. The Church in history. Vol. 2. Crestwood, NY: St. Vladimir's Seminary Press. ISBN 978-0-88-141056-3.
- Moorhead, John (2013). Justinian. London: Routledge. ISBN 9781317898795.
- Ostrogorsky, George (1956). History of the Byzantine State. Oxford: Basil Blackwell. Archived from the original on 23 April 2023.
- Rosen, William (2007). Justinian's Flea: Plague, Empire, and the Birth of Europe. Viking Adult. ISBN 978-0-670-03855-8.
- Rubin, Berthold (1960). Das Zeitalter Iustinians. Berlin: Walter de Gruyter & Co. OCLC 7320555. German standard work; partially obsolete, but still useful.
- Sarris, Peter (2006). Economy and society in the age of Justinian. Cambridge: Cambridge University Press. ISBN 9781139459044.
- Sarris, Peter (2023). Justinian: Emperor, Soldier, Saint. Basic Books. ISBN 978-1-5416-0177-2.
- Ure, PN (1951). Justinian and his Age. Penguin, Harmondsworth.
- Vasiliev, A. A. (1952). History of the Byzantine Empire (2nd ed.). Madison.
- Sidney Dean; Duncan B. Campbell; Ian Hughes; Ross Cowan; Raffaele D'Amato; Christopher Lillington-Martin, eds. (June–July 2010). "Justinian's fireman: Belisarius and the Byzantine empire". Ancient Warfare. IV (3).
- Turlej, Stanisław (2016). Justiniana Prima: An Underestimated Aspect of Justinian's Church Policy. Krakow: Jagiellonian University Press. ISBN 978-8323395560.

=== Primary sources ===
- Procopius, Historia Arcana.
  - The Anecdota or Secret History . Edited by H. B. Dewing. 7 vols. Loeb Classical Library. Harvard University Press and London, Hutchinson, 1914–40. Greek text and English translation.
  - Haury, J.; Wirth, G., eds. (1962–64). Procopii Caesariensis opera omnia (3 vols. ed.). Teubner. Archived from the original on 25 January 2022.
  - The Secret History, translated by G.A. Williamson. Harmondsworth: Penguin Books, 1966. A readable and accessible English translation of the Anecdota.
- John Malalas, Chronicle , translated by Elizabeth Jeffreys, Michael Jeffreys & Roger Scott, 1986. Byzantina Australiensia 4 (Melbourne: Australian Association for Byzantine Studies) ISBN 0-9593626-2-2
- Evagrius Scholasticus, Ecclesiastical History, translated by Edward Walford (1846), reprinted 2008. Evolution Publishing, ISBN 978-1-889758-88-6.

Regnal titles
Preceded by Justin I	Byzantine emperor 527–565 with Justin I (527)	Succeeded by Justin II
Political offices
Preceded by Rusticius; Vitalianus	Roman consul 521; With: Valerius	Succeeded by Symmachus; Boethius
Preceded by Vettius Agorius Basilius Mavortius	Roman consul 528	Succeeded by Decius
Vacant Title last held by Rufius Gennadius Probus Orestes; Lampadius	Roman consul 533–534 with Decius Paulinus (534)	Succeeded by Belisarius
