= Primary Russia =

- Russian: Русь изначальная
- Directed by: Gennady Vasilyev
- Written by: Valentin Ivanov; Gennady Vasilyev; Mikhail Vorfolomeyev
- Produced by: Igor Zuyev
- Starring: Lyudmila Chursina; Boris Nevzorov; Innokenty Smoktunovsky; Margarita Terekhova; Elena Kondulainen
- Cinematography: Aleksandr Garibyan
- Edited by: Valeria Vasilyeva
- Music by: Aleksey Rybnikov
- Production company: Gorky Film Studio
- Release date: 1985
- Running time: 140 min.
- Country: Soviet Union
- Language: Russian

Primary Russia (Russian: Русь изначальная, romanized: Rus iznachalnaya) is a 1985 Soviet historical epic film directed by Gennady Vasilyev.

The film takes place in Ancient Rus', when Ratibor united the Slavs into one army and rebuffed the nomads.

== Plot ==
In the year 532, the Byzantine capital of Constantinople erupts in the Nika uprising against Emperor Justinian. Amid the chaos, rebels free several prisoners condemned to public execution, including Malchus, a freethinker and philosopher with Manichaean beliefs. When the revolt is suppressed, Malchus is sentenced to serve as a galley slave. However, he is noticed and freed by Demetrius, a scheming priest who demands Malchus’s assistance in missionary work among the pagan tribes known as the Rossichi. Malchus ultimately deserts and joins the Rossichi, coming to admire their simple, wise customs and sense of justice.

By 558, the fragmented pagan tribes of the Rossichi face a new threat: Byzantine interference stirs three Khazar chieftains to attack them. The Rossichi succeed in fending off the brutal invasion, but their leader, Vseslav, falls victim to a Byzantine emissary’s treachery and is poisoned during peace negotiations. Following Malchus's counsel, the new leader of the Antae, Ratibor, gathers an army and storms the Byzantine frontier fortress of Topir, the empire’s gateway. This decisive victory forces Byzantium to sign a peace agreement with the Rossichi.

== Cast ==
- Lyudmila Chursina as Aneya
- Boris Nevzorov as Vseslav
- Innokenty Smoktunovsky as Emperor Justinian
- Margarita Terekhova as Theodora
- Elena Kondulainen as Mlava
- Arnis Licitis as Malkh
- Igor Dmitriev as Tribonian
- Vladimir Talashko as Demetrius
- Vladimir Antonik as Ratibor
- Viktor Gogolev as Velimudr
- Mikhail Kokshenov as Kolot
- Mikhail Svetin as Repartius
- Yevgeny Steblov as Hypatius
- Elguja Burduli as Belisarius
- Georgi Yumatov as sentenced to death
