= Inessa Abesadze =

Georgian actress

Inessa Shalvovna Abesadze (Georgian: ინეზა შალვოვანი აბესაძე, Russian: Инесса Шалвовна Абесадзе; 1940 — March 7, 2024) was a Soviet and Georgian theater and film actress.

She was born in 1940 in Tbilisi. She graduated from the Faculty of Film Actors of the Shota Rustaveli Theatre and Film University.

She was the wife of actor Elguja Burduli. They had three children:

- Lado (born 1964), one of the pioneers of Georgian alternative music;
- Maka (born 1965), actor, documentary film director;
- Bakuri (born 1975), rock musician.

== Filmography ==
- 1981: Swimmer (episode) dir. Irakli Kvirikadze
- 1989: Holiday in Anticipation of the Holiday (episode) dir. Leila Gordeladze
