= Elguja Burduli =

Georgian Russian actor (1941–2022)

- Burduli in 1999
- Born: Elguja Vladimirovich Burduli; 1 April 1941; Tbilisi, Georgian SSR, USSR
- Died: 5 March 2022 (aged 80)
- Occupations: Actor, singer
- Years active: 1974–2019
- Spouse: Inessa Abesadze
- Awards: Nika Awards (1993)

Elguja Vladimirovich Burduli (Georgian: ელგუჯა ვლადიმერის ძე ბურდული; 1 April 1941 — 5 March 2022) was a Soviet and Georgian film actor, singer.

== Life and career ==
Burduli was born in Tbilisi on 1 April 1941. In 1959 he entered the evening department of the Georgian Technical University and studied at the Faculty of Civil Engineering until 1969. He was a lifeguard on the Tbilisi Sea (1958–1969), a member of the Sukhishvili Georgian National Ballet (1961–1964) and a worker at filling station (1964–1984). His acting career started in 1974.

In 2021, Burduli was awarded the title of Honorary Citizen of Tbilisi. Burduli died on 5 March 2022, at the age of 80.

== Selected filmography ==
- Hatred as Prokhor (1977)
- Primary Russia as Belisarius (1985)
- Boris Godunov as Arab merchant (1986)
- Dark Eyes as Arab merchant (1986)
- Hard to Be a God as Baron Pampa (1989)
- The Sun of the Sleepless as Gela Bendeliani (1992)
- A Chef in Love as an old man (1996)
- Going Vertical as Georgian aksakal (2017)
