= 501 =

Calendar year

501 in various calendars
Gregorian calendar	501; DI
Ab urbe condita	1254
Assyrian calendar	5251
Balinese saka calendar	422–423
Bengali calendar	−93 – −92
Berber calendar	1451
Buddhist calendar	1045
Burmese calendar	−137
Byzantine calendar	6009–6010
Chinese calendar	庚辰年 (Metal Dragon); 3198 or 2991 — to — 辛巳年 (Metal Snake); 3199 or 2992
Coptic calendar	217–218
Discordian calendar	1667
Ethiopian calendar	493–494
Hebrew calendar	4261–4262
- Hindu calendars
Vikram Samvat	557–558
Shaka Samvat	422–423
Kali Yuga	3601–3602
Holocene calendar	10501
Iranian calendar	121 BP – 120 BP
Islamic calendar	125 BH – 124 BH
Javanese calendar	387–388
Julian calendar	501; DI
Korean calendar	2834
Minguo calendar	1411 before ROC 民前1411年
Nanakshahi calendar	−967
Seleucid era	812/813 AG
Thai solar calendar	1043–1044
Tibetan calendar	ལྕགས་ཕོ་འབྲུག་ལོ་ (male Iron-Dragon); 627 or 246 or −526 — to — ལྕགས་མོ་སྦྲུལ་ལོ་ (female Iron-Snake); 628 or 247 or −525

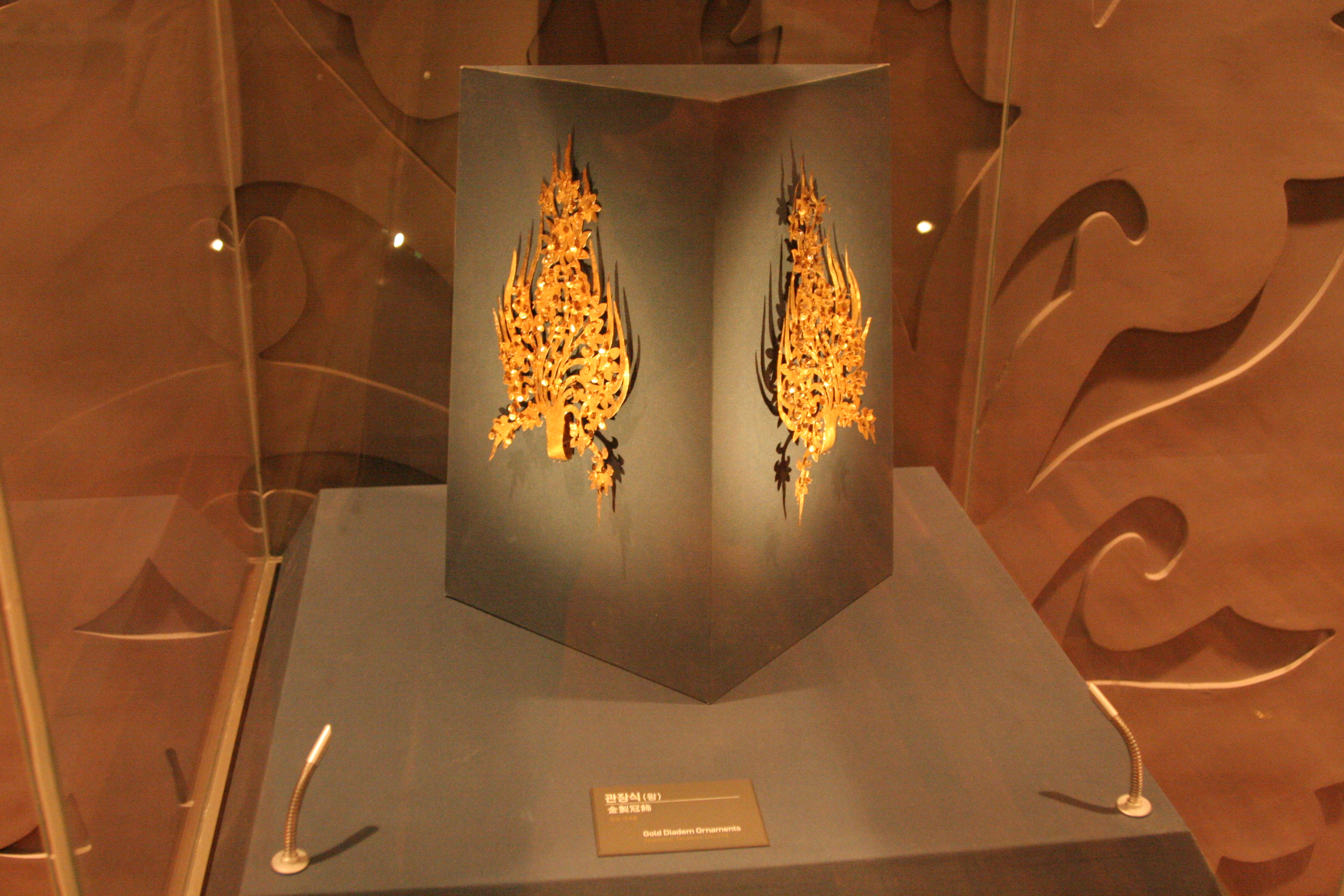
Crown of king Muryeong (Korea)

Year 501 (DI) was a common year starting on Monday of the Julian calendar. At the time, it was known as the Year of the Consulship of Avienus and Pompeius (or, less frequently, year 1254 Ab urbe condita). The denomination 501 for this year has been used since the early medieval period, when the Anno Domini calendar era became the prevalent method in Europe for naming years.

== Events ==
=== By place ===
==== Britannia ====
- Domangart Réti succeeds his father Fergus Mór, after he dies during a campaign against the Picts. He becomes the new king of Dál Riata (modern Scotland) (according to the Annals of Tigernach).

==== Europe ====
- Burgundian Civil War: King Gundobad breaks his promise of tribute and regains his military power. He besieges his brother Godegisel at the city of Vienne (Burgundy), and murders him in an Arian church along with the bishop.

==== Asia ====
- Dong Hun Hou is killed during a siege of the capital Jiankang. He is succeeded by his brother Qi He Di, who becomes emperor of Southern Qi (China).
- Muryeong becomes king of Baekje (one of the Three Kingdoms of Korea). During his reign, the kingdom remains allied with Silla and expands its relationships with China and Japan.

==== Central America ====
- June 5 – Ahkal Moʼ Nahb I becomes the new ruler of the Mayan city-state of Palenque (in what is now the state of Chiapas in southern Mexico), and reigns until his death in 524.
- The Maya are peaking in economic prosperity. The civilization at Teotihuacan begins to decline and its people are migrating to the greatest Mayan city, Tikal, bringing with them ideas about weaponry and new ritual practices.

=== By topic ===
==== Medicine ====
- The Sushruta Samhita medical book becomes a classic of medicine in India. The book contains descriptions of surgery, illnesses, medicinal plants, and a detailed study on anatomy (approximate date).

==== Religion ====
- Pope Symmachus, accused of various crimes by secular authorities who support an ecclesiastical opponent, asserts that the secular ruler has no jurisdiction over him. A synod held in 502 will confirm that view.

== Births ==
- Lou Zhaojun, empress dowager of Northern Qi (d. 562)
- Xiao Tong, crown prince of the Liang Dynasty (d. 531)

== Deaths ==
- April 25 – Rusticus, archbishop of Lyon
- Dongseong, king of Baekje (Korea)
- Fergus Mór, king of Dál Riata (Scotland)
- Godegisel, king of the Burgundians
- Pan Yunu, concubine of Xiao Baojuan
- Ravina II, Jewish Talmudist and rabbi
- Su Xiaoxiao, Chinese Gējì and poet
- Xiao Baojuan, emperor of Southern Qi (b. 483)
- Teudelinda, Burgundian queen consort
