= AD 502 =

Calendar year

502 in various calendars
- Gregorian calendar: 502; DII
- Ab urbe condita: 1255
- Assyrian calendar: 5252
- Balinese saka calendar: 423–424
- Bengali calendar: −92 – −91
- Berber calendar: 1452
- Buddhist calendar: 1046
- Burmese calendar: −136
- Byzantine calendar: 6010–6011
- Chinese calendar: 辛巳年 (Metal Snake); 3199 or 2992 — to — 壬午年 (Water Horse); 3200 or 2993
- Coptic calendar: 218–219
- Discordian calendar: 1668
- Ethiopian calendar: 494–495
- Hebrew calendar: 4262–4263
- Hindu calendars
- Vikram Samvat: 558–559
- Shaka Samvat: 423–424
- Kali Yuga: 3602–3603
- Holocene calendar: 10502
- Iranian calendar: 120 BP – 119 BP
- Islamic calendar: 124 BH – 123 BH
- Javanese calendar: 388–389
- Julian calendar: 502; DII
- Korean calendar: 2835
- Minguo calendar: 1410 before ROC 民前1410年
- Nanakshahi calendar: −966
- Seleucid era: 813/814 AG
- Thai solar calendar: 1044–1045
- Tibetan calendar: ལྕགས་མོ་སྦྲུལ་ལོ་ (female Iron-Snake); 628 or 247 or −525 — to — ཆུ་ཕོ་རྟ་ལོ་ (male Water-Horse); 629 or 248 or −524

The Roman-Persian frontier in Late Antiquity

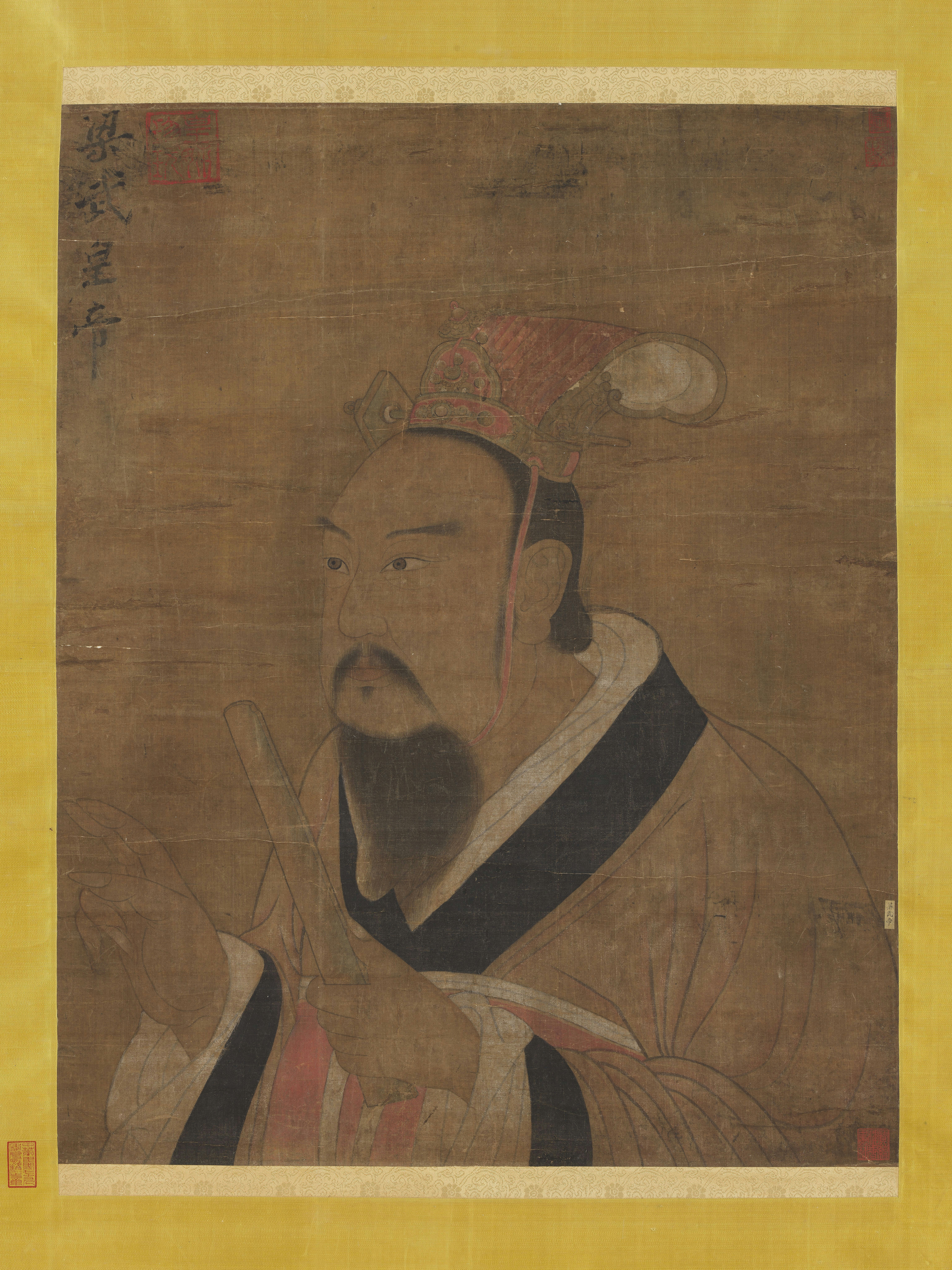
Emperor Wu Di (502–549)

Year 502 (DII) was a common year starting on Tuesday of the Julian calendar. At the time, it was known as the Year of the Consulship of Avienus and Probus (or, less frequently, year 1255 Ab urbe condita). The denomination 502 for this year has been used since the early medieval period, when the Anno Domini calendar era became the prevalent method in Europe for naming years.

== Events ==
=== By place ===
==== Byzantine Empire ====
- War with Sassanid Persia: Emperor Anastasius I refuses to pay a share of the cost of defending the Caucasian Gates, through which nomadic tribes have come for raids on Persia and the Byzantine Empire. King Kavadh I invades Armenia and captures Theodosiopolis.
- Winter – Kavadh I besieges the fortress-city of Amida (modern Turkey). The defenders, although unsupported by Byzantine troops, repel the Persian assaults for three months before they are finally beaten.

==== Europe ====
- March 29 – King Gundobad issues a new legal code (Lex Burgundionum) at Lyon, that makes Gallo-Romans and Burgundians subject to the same laws (approximate date).
- The Bulgars ravage Thrace. A semi-nomadic people, they have absorbed the surviving Huns and meet no opposition from Byzantine forces.

==== China ====
- The Liang Dynasty is founded by Xiao Yan, who marches on Jiankang (later Nanjing). Emperor He Di, age 14, is put to death. The Southern Qi Dynasty ends and Wu Di becomes ruler of the Liang Dynasty.
- December 24 - Xiao Yan names Xiao Tong his heir designate.
- The Nanhua Temple, located southeast of Shaoguan, is founded by the Indian monk Zhiyao Sanzang. The temple covers an area of 42.5 hectares (105 acres) and consists of a set of historical Buddhist buildings.

=== By topic ===
==== Arts and sciences ====
- The Persian philosopher Mazdak declares private property to be the source of all evil.

==== Literature ====
- The Chinese Book of Song is finished. The text is one of the Twenty-Four Histories, a traditional collection of historical records during the Southern and Northern Dynasties.

==== Religion ====
- Caesarius becomes bishop of Arles. His episcopal see, near the mouth of the Rhone River and close to Marseille, retains its ancient importance in the social and commercial life of Gaul for forty years.
- October 23 – The Synodus Palmaris, called by Gothic king Theodoric the Great, clears Pope Symmachus of all charges, thus ending the schism of Antipope Laurentius.

== Births ==
- Amalaric, king of the Visigoths (d. 531)

== Deaths ==
- Genevieve, patron saint of Paris (approximate date)
- He Di, Chinese emperor of Southern Qi (b. 488)
- Narsai, Syrian poet and theologian (approximate date)
- Vakhtang I, Georgian king (approximate date)
