= 502 =

502 may refer to:

- 502 (number), a number
- 502 (Clan), Code for the Dawasir
- AD 502, a year
- 502 BC, a year
- Area code 502, a North American telephone area code in northern central Kentucky, including Louisville
- List of highways numbered 502
- "502" (song), by Megadeth
- "502", a song by Marduk on the album Panzer Division Marduk about the 502nd Heavy Panzer Battalion.
- HTTP 502, the HTTP error response status for "Bad Gateway"
- Fiat 502, a passenger car
- A variant of the Chevrolet big-block engine, named for its cubic inch displacement

== See also ==
- 502nd (disambiguation)
