= Consort Pan =

Consort Pan may refer to:

- Pan Shu (died 252), wife of Sun Quan (Emperor Da of Eastern Wu)
- Consort Pan (Liu Song) (died 453), concubine of Liu Yilong (Emperor Wen of Liu Song)
- Pan Yunu (died 501), concubine of Xiao Baojuan (emperor of Southern Qi)
- Princess Pan (968–989), first wife of the future Emperor Zhenzong of Song

== See also ==
- Consort Ban (c. 48–2 BC), concubine of Emperor Cheng of Han
