= 502nd Regiment =

502nd Regiment may refer to:

- 502nd Infantry Regiment, United States
- 502nd Electronic Warfare Regiment, Ukraine

== See also ==
- 502nd (disambiguation)
