= Siege of Amida =

Siege of Amida may refer to:

- Siege of Amida (359) during the Persian–Roman wars
- Siege of Amida (502–503) during the Persian–Roman wars

== See also ==
- Ferret Music, partnered with Siege of Amida Records
