= 502nd =

502nd may refer to:

== Fiction ==
- 502nd Joint Fighter Wing "Brave Witches" - a fictional air force unit in the anime series Brave Witches

== Military ==
- 502nd Heavy Tank Battalion (Germany), a German World War II independent armored battalion equipped with heavy tanks
- 502nd Infantry Regiment (United States), an airborne forces regiment of the US Army
  - 502nd Parachute Battalion, the second battalion-sized unit in US Army airborne forces history
- 502nd SS Jäger Battalion, a Nazi Germany special forces unit from 1943 to 1944
- 502nd Tactical Control Group, a United States Air Force unit that fought in the Korean War

== See also ==
- 502 (number)
- 502 (disambiguation)
- AD 502, the year 502 (DII) of the Julian calendar
- 502 BC
