= Ammianus Marcellinus =

4th-century Roman historian and soldier

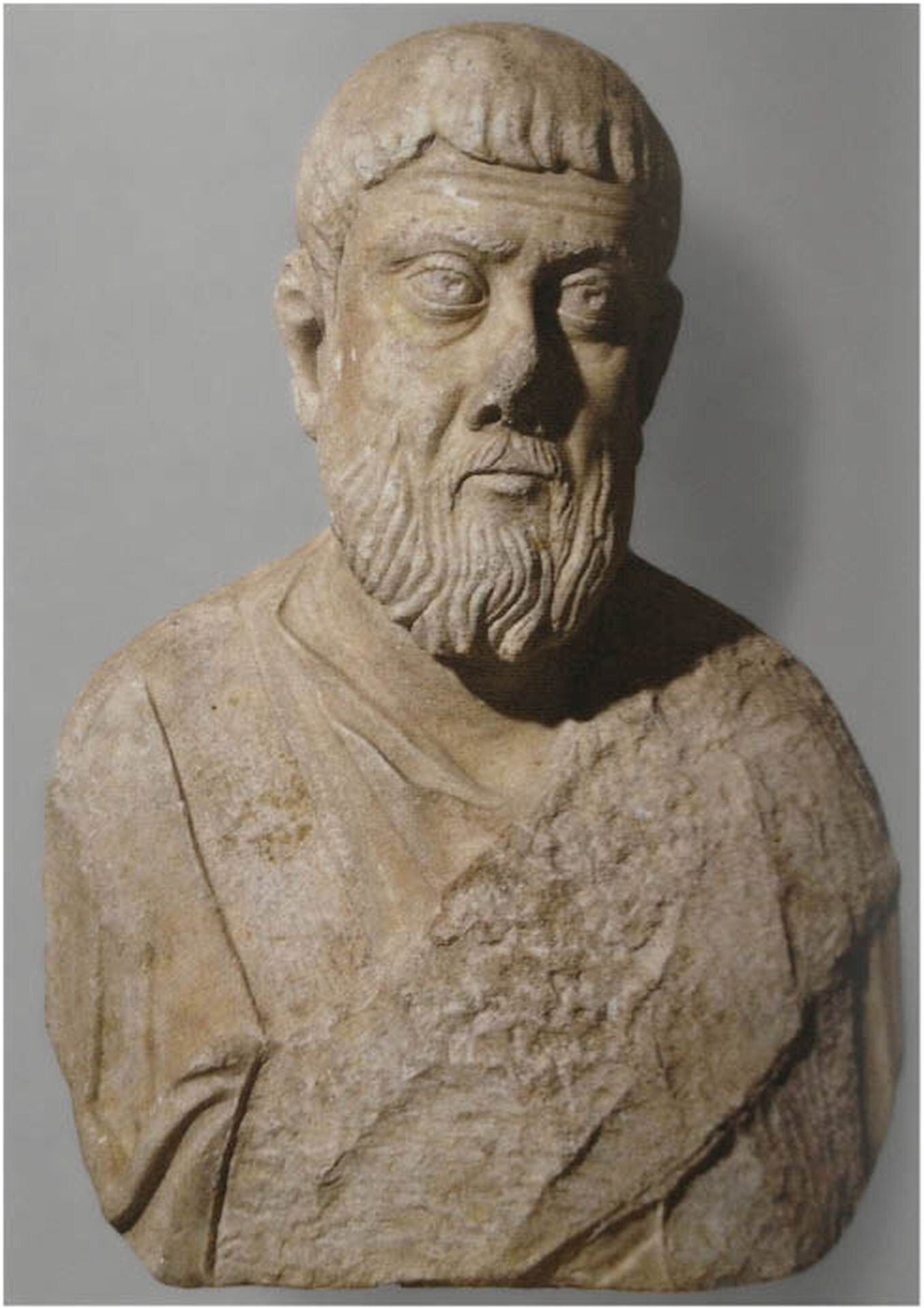
- 4th century bust of a Greek man, presumed to be Ammianus Marcellinus
- Born: c. 330; Roman Syria, possibly in Antioch
- Died: c. 391–400
- Occupations: Historian and soldier
- Notable work: Res gestae

Ammianus Marcellinus, occasionally anglicized as Ammian (Ἀμμιανὸς Μαρκελλῖνος; c. 330 – c. 391 – 400), was a Roman soldier and historian who wrote the penultimate major historical account surviving from antiquity (preceding Procopius). Written in Latin and known as the Res gestae, his work chronicled the history of Rome from the accession of Emperor Nerva in 96 to the death of Valens at the Battle of Adrianople in 378. Only the sections covering the period 353 to 378 survive.

== Biography ==
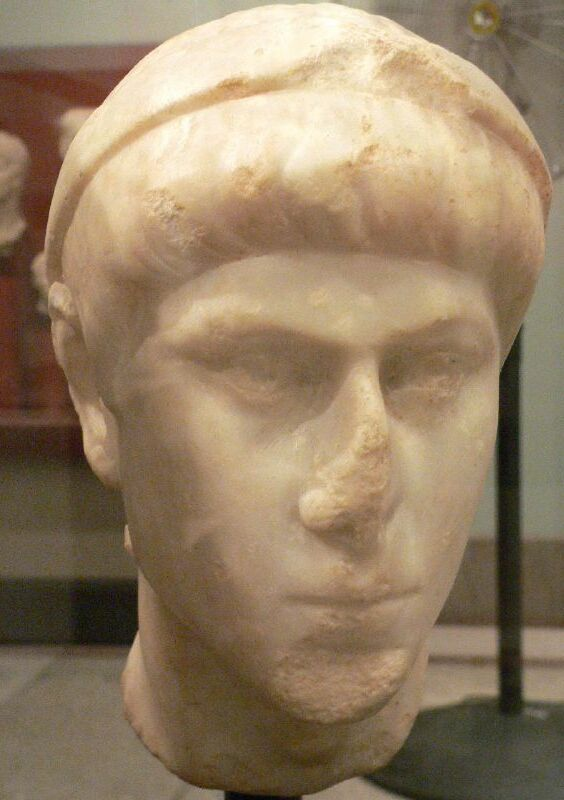
Bust of Emperor Constantius II from Syria

Ammianus was born in the Roman Levant, possibly in Syria or Phoenicia, (Note: Following earlier scholars, Matthews suggested a hometown of Antioch on the Orontes based on the assumption that Ammianus was the recipient of a letter from a pagan contemporary, Libanius, to a certain Marcellinus; however Formara in 1992 argued that this letter must have referred in fact to a younger man and an orator newly arrived in Rome, rather than Ammianus, who had long been a resident in the city, and Barnes solidified this stance in modern scholarship. However, many scholars remain convinced that Ammianus was a native of Antioch.) around 330, into a noble family of Greek origin. Since he calls himself Graecus (lit. Greek), he was most likely born in a Greek-speaking area of the empire. His native language was Greek, but he also knew Latin.

Ammianus began his career as a domesticus, where he gained firsthand experience in various military campaigns. He served as an officer in the army of the emperors Constantius II and Julian. He served in Gaul (Julian) and in the east (twice for Constantius, once under Julian). He professes to have been "a former soldier and a Greek" (miles quondam et graecus), and his enrollment among the elite protectors domestic (household guards) shows that he was of the middle class or higher birth. Consensus is that Ammianus probably came from a curial family, but it is also possible that he was the son of a comes Orientis of the same family name. He entered the army at an early age, when Constantius II was emperor of the East, and was sent to serve under Ursicinus, governor of Nisibis in Mesopotamia, and magister militum. Ammianus campaigned in the East twice under Ursicinus.

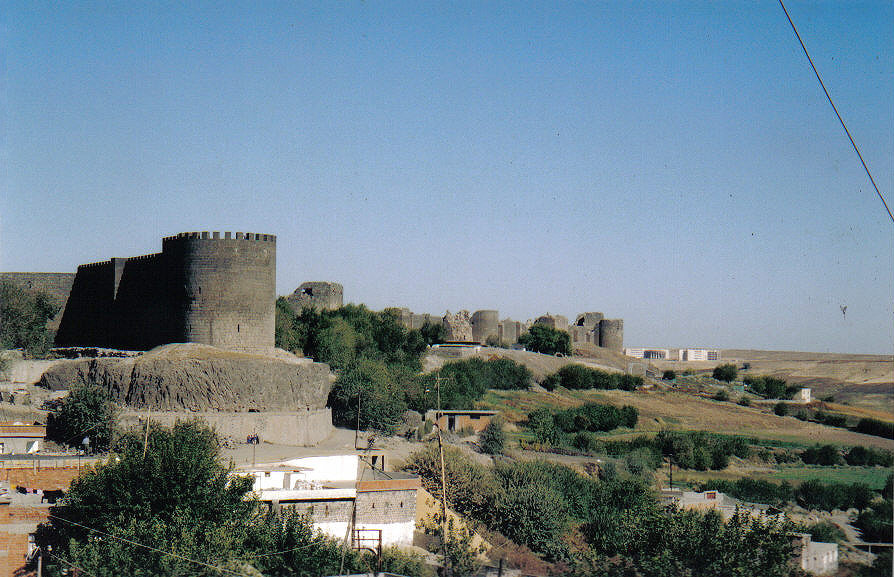
The walls of Amida, built by Constantius II before the Siege of Amida of 359. Ammianus himself was present in the city until a day before its fall.

He traveled with Ursicinus to Italy in an expedition against Silvanus, an officer who had proclaimed himself emperor in Gaul. Ursicinus ended the threat by having Silvanus assassinated, then stayed in the region to help install Julian as Caesar of Gaul, Spain, and Britain. Ammianus probably met Julian for the first time while serving on Ursicinus' staff in Gaul.

In 359, Constantius sent Ursicinus back to the east to help in the defense against a Persian invasion led by King Shapur II himself. Ammianus returned with his commander to the East and again served Ursicinus as a staff officer. Ursicinus, although he was the more experienced commander, was placed under the command of Sabinianus, the Magister Peditum of the east. The two did not get along, resulting in a lack of cooperation between the Limitanei (border regiments) of Mesopotamia and Osrhoene under Ursicinus' command and the comitatus (field army) of Sabinianus. While on a mission near Nisibis, Ammianus spotted a Persian patrol which was about to try to capture Ursicinus, and warned his commander in time. In an attempt to locate the Persian Royal Army, Ursicinus sent Ammianus to Jovinianus, the semi-independent governor of Corduene, and a friend of Ursicinus. Ammianus successfully located the Persian main body and reported his findings to Ursicinus.

After his mission in Corduene, Ammianus left the headquarters at Amida in the retinue of Ursinicus, who was on a mission to make sure the bridges across the Euphrates were demolished. They were attacked by the Persian vanguard, who had made a night march in an attempt to catch the Romans at Amida unprepared. After a protracted cavalry battle, the Romans were scattered; Ursicinus evaded capture and fled to Melitene, while Ammianus made a difficult journey back to Amida with a wounded comrade. The Persians besieged and eventually sacked Amida, and Ammianus barely escaped with his life.

When Ursicinus was dismissed from his military post by Constantius, Ammianus too seems to have retired from the military; however, reevaluation of his participation in Julian's Persian campaign has led modern scholarship to suggest that he continued his service but did not for some reason include the period in his history. He accompanied Julian, for whom he expresses enthusiastic admiration, in his campaigns against the Alamanni and the Sassanids. After Julian's death, Ammianus accompanied the retreat of the new emperor, Jovian, as far as Antioch. He was residing in Antioch in 372 when a certain Theodorus was thought to have been identified as the successor to the emperor Valens by divination. Speaking as an alleged eyewitness, Ammianus recounts how Theodorus and several others were made to confess their deceit through the use of torture, and cruelly punished.

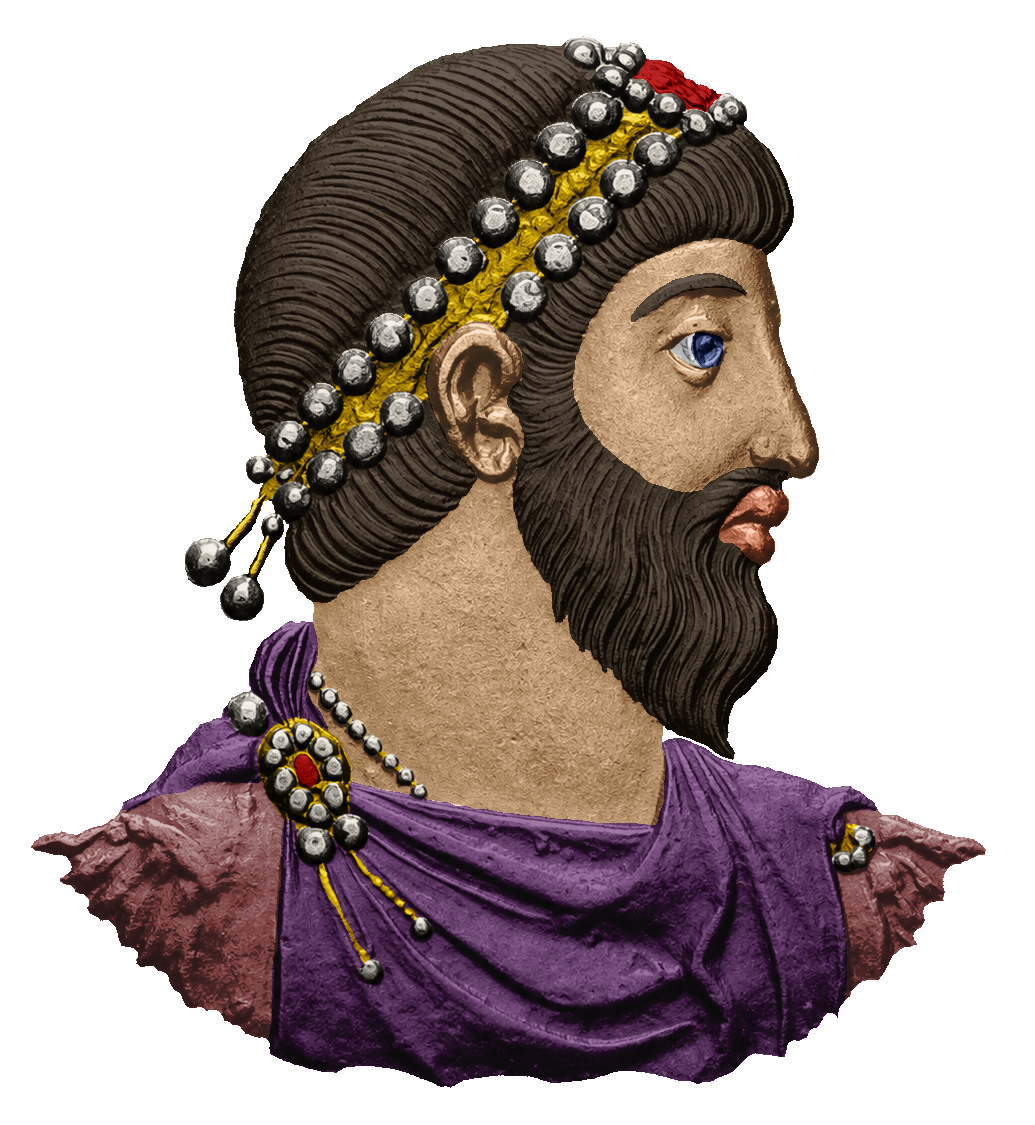
Portrait of Julian from a bronze coin of Antioch

He eventually settled in Rome and began the Res gestae. The precise year of his death is unknown, but scholarly consensus places it somewhere between 392 and 400 at the latest.

Modern scholarship generally describes Ammianus as a pagan who was tolerant of Christians. He writes of Christianity as being a "plain and simple" religion that demands only what is just and mild, and when he condemns the actions of Christians, he does not do so based on their Christianity as such. His lifetime was marked by lengthy outbreaks of sectarian and dogmatic strife within the new state-backed faith, often with violent consequences (especially the Arian controversy) and these conflicts sometimes appeared unworthy to him, though it was territory where he could not risk going very far in criticism, due to the growing and volatile political connections between the church and imperial power.

Ammianus was not blind to the faults of Christians or of pagans and was especially critical of them; he commented that "no wild beasts are so hostile to men as Christian sects, in general, are to one another" and he condemns the emperor Julian for excessive attachment to (pagan) sacrifice, and for his edict effectively barring Christians from teaching posts.

== Work ==
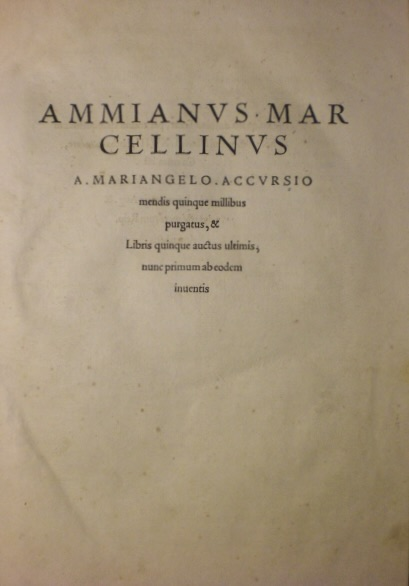
Title page to the 1533 editio princeps of books XXVII–XXXI of Res gestae, the first complete edition of the surviving books

While living in Rome in the 380s, Ammianus wrote a Latin history of the Roman empire from the accession of Nerva (96) to the death of Valens at the Battle of Adrianople (378), in effect writing a continuation of the history of Tacitus. At 22.16.12, he praises the Serapeum of Alexandria in Egypt as the glory of the empire, so his work was presumably completed before the destruction of that building in 391.

The Res gestae (Rerum gestarum libri XXXI) was originally composed of thirty-one books, but the first thirteen have been lost. (Note: Historian T. D. Barnes argues that the original was actually thirty-six books, which if correct would mean that eighteen books have been lost.). However, substantial fragments of a Greek summary of Books I-XXV have been identified in several Byzantine histories. The surviving eighteen books, covering the period from 353 to 378, constitute the foundation of modern understanding of the history of the fourth-century Roman Empire. They are lauded as a clear, comprehensive, and generally impartial account of events by a contemporary; like many ancient historians, however, Ammianus was in fact not impartial, although he expresses an intention to be so, and had strong moral and religious prejudices. Although criticized as lacking literary merit by his early biographers, he was in fact quite skilled in rhetoric, which significantly has brought the veracity of some of the Res gestae into question.

His work has suffered substantially from manuscript transmission. Aside from the loss of the first thirteen books, the remaining eighteen are in many places corrupt and lacunose. The sole surviving manuscript from which almost every other is derived is a ninth-century Carolingian text, Vatican lat. 1873 (V), produced in Fulda from an insular exemplar. The only independent textual source for Ammianus lies in Fragmenta Marburgensia (M), another ninth-century Frankish codex which was taken apart to provide covers for account-books during the fifteenth century. Only six leaves of M survive; however, before this manuscript was dismantled the Abbot of Hersfeld lent the manuscript to Sigismund Gelenius, who used it in preparing the text of the second Froben edition (G). The dates and relationship of V and M were long disputed until 1936 when R. P. Robinson demonstrated persuasively that V was copied from M. As L. D. Reynolds summarizes, "M is thus a fragment of the archetype; symptoms of an insular pre-archetype are evident."

His handling from his earliest printers was little better. The editio princeps was printed in 1474 in Rome by Georg Sachsel and Bartholomaeus Golsch, which broke off at the end of Book 26. The next edition (Bologna, 1517) suffered from its editor's conjectures upon the poor text of the 1474 edition; the 1474 edition was pirated for the first Froben edition (Basle, 1518). It was not until 1533 that the last five books of Ammianus' history were put into print by Silvanus Otmar and edited by Mariangelus Accursius. The first modern edition was produced by C.U. Clark (Berlin, 1910–1913). The first English translations were by Philemon Holland in 1609, and later by C.D. Yonge in 1862.

== Reception ==
Edward Gibbon judged Ammianus "an accurate and faithful guide, who composed the history of his own times without indulging the prejudices and passions which usually affect the mind of a contemporary." But he also condemned Ammianus for lack of literary flair: "The coarse and undistinguishing pencil of Ammianus has delineated his bloody figures with tedious and disgusting accuracy." Austrian historian Ernst Stein praised Ammianus as "the greatest literary genius that the world produced between Tacitus and Dante".

According to Kimberly Kagan, his accounts of battles emphasize the experience of the soldiers but at the cost of ignoring the bigger picture. As a result, it is difficult for the reader to understand why the battles he describes had the outcome they did.

Ammianus' work contains a detailed description of the earthquake and tsunami of 365 in Alexandria, which devastated the metropolis and the shores of the eastern Mediterranean on 21 July 365. His report describes accurately the characteristic sequence of earthquake, retreat of the sea, and sudden incoming giant wave.

== Sources ==
Editions and translations

- Marcellinus, Ammianus (1894). The Roman History of Ammianus Marcellinus. Translated by C.D. Yonge. London: George Bell & Sons. OCLC 4540204.
- Thayer, Bill (10 February 2008). "LacusCurtius • Ammian (Ammianus Marcellinus)". penelope.uchicago.edu.

Studies

- "Ammian, History". Lexundria.
- Barnes, Timothy D. (1998). Ammianus Marcellinus and the Representation of Historical Reality (Cornell Studies in Classical Philology). Cornell University Press. ISBN 080143526-9.
- Bouchier, Edmund Spenser (1916). Syria as a Roman Province. B. H. Blackwell.
- Sanz Casasnovas, Gabriel (2022). "Rabies indomita": representación del bárbaro y violencia contra los no romanos en las "Res gestae" de Amiano Marcelino. Zaragoza: Prensas de la Universidad de Zaragoza. ISBN 9788413404479.
- Fisher, H. A. L. (1918). "The Last Latin Historian". Quarterly Review. 230 July.
- Frakes, Robert M. (1997). "Ammianus Marcellinus and Zonaras on a Late Roman Assassination Plot". Historia: Zeitschrift für Alte Geschichte. Bd. 46, H. 1 1st Qtr.
- Gibbon, Edward (1995). Bury, J.B. (ed.). Decline and Fall of the Roman Empire. Vol. I. Random House. ISBN 978-0-679-60148-7.
- Hodgkin, Thomas (1880). Italy and Her Invaders. Clarendon Press.
- Hunt, E.D. (1985). "Christians and Christianity in Ammianus Marcellinus". Classical Quarterly. New Series. 35 (1): 186–200. doi:10.1017/S0009838800014671. JSTOR 638815. S2CID 171046986.
- Jenkins, Fred W. (2017). Ammianus Marcellinus: An Annotated Bibliography, 1474 to the Present. Brill.
- Kagan, Kimberly (2009). The Eye of Command. University of Michigan Press.
- Kelly, G. (2004). "Ammianus and the Great Tsunami". Journal of Roman Studies. 94: 141–167. doi:10.2307/4135013. hdl:20.500.11820/635a4807-14c9-4044-9caa-8f8e3005cb24. JSTOR 4135013. S2CID 160152988.
- Kelly, Gavin (2008). Ammianus Marcellinus: The Allusive Historian. Cambridge University Press. ISBN 978-0-521-84299-0.
- Matthews, J. (1989). The Roman Empire of Ammianus. Johns Hopkins University Press.
- Moulton, Carroll (1998). Ancient Greece and Rome: Achaea-Delphi. Scribner. ISBN 978-0-684-80503-0.
- Norden, Eduard (1909). Antika Kunstprosa. Leipzig.
- Reynolds, L. D., ed. (1983). Texts and Transmission: A Survey of the Latin Classics. Clarendon Press.
- Stein, E. (1928). Geschichte des spätrömischen Reiches [History of the late-Roman empire] (in German). Vienna.
- Treadgold, Warren T. (2023). "The Byzantine Summaries of the Lost Books of Ammianus Marcellinus". Journal of Byzantine Studies/Jahrbuch der Oesterreichischen Byzantinistik. 73: 251–298.
- Treadgold, Warren T. (1997). A history of the Byzantine state and society. Stanford University Press. p. 133. ISBN 978-0-8047-2630-6.
- Young, George Frederick (1916). East and West Through Fifteen Centuries: Being a General History from B.C. 44 to A.D. 1453. Longmans, Green and Co. – via Internet Archive.
