= Patricius (consul 500) =

- Died: after 519
- Military career
- Allegiance: Byzantine Empire
- Rank: magister militum
- Conflicts: Anastasian War

Flavius Patricius (Greek: Πατρίκιος; died after 519) was a prominent Eastern Roman general and statesman during the reign of Byzantine emperor Anastasius I (r. 491–518).

== Biography ==
=== Origins and early career ===
Flavius Patricius was born in Phrygia, but otherwise nothing is known of his early life. Raised to the consulate in 500 along with Anastasius's nephew Hypatius, he was already considered elderly at the time. In the same year, he was placed as magister militum praesentalis (one of the two magistri militum "in the presence" of the emperor), a post he held until Anastasius's death in July 518. The bishop and historian Zacharias of Mytilene characteristically calls him "upright and trustworthy, but with slight intelligence."

=== Campaigns against Persia ===
In 502, the Anastasian War with Sassanid Persia broke out. Thus in 503, along with Hypatius and Areobindus Dagalaiphus Areobindus, Patricius was sent east to campaign against the Persians. He invaded the Persian province of Arzanene, sacking various forts and taking prisoners, before returning to join forces with Hypatius. While Areobindus was detailed to keep watch on the Persian stronghold of Nisibis and on the army of Shah Kavadh I (r. 488–531) from Dara, Patricius and Hypatius, with the main force of 40,000 men (an enormous army for the time), were tasked with the recapture of Amida. Although the siege of Amida proved fruitless, together they won a skirmish against some Hephthalite Huns. Their success, however, made them careless, allowing them to be surprised by the main Persian army under Kavadh. Defeated, they retreated across the Euphrates to Samosata. In the aftermath of this, Hypatius was recalled, but Patricius stayed on.

In early 504, Patricius successfully intercepted a supply convoy for the garrison of Amida. He then defeated the Persian reinforcements, capturing their commanders, and resumed the siege of the city. He pursued the siege vigorously, destroying part of the city's outer walls by undermining them, and ambushing and killing the garrison commander Glones. He was, however, unable to take the city until the end of hostilities. At that point, he arranged the ransom of the city.

=== Involvement in civil war ===
Back in Constantinople, Patricius became involved in the theological disputes that troubled much of Anastasius's reign. During the rebellion of Vitalian, Patricius was used by Anastasius as an ambassador, since he had known both Vitalian and his father, and had promoted the former's career in the past. Nevertheless, due to this friendship, he refused to attack Vitalian's army during his third assault on Constantinople in 515, ostensibly because he feared that he would be accused of treason in the case of a defeat.

=== Imperial candidacy ===
In 518, at the death of Anastasius, Patricius was put forward as one of the candidates to succeed him by the men of the Scholae Palatinae. His candidacy, however, was not accepted by the imperial bodyguard, the excubitores, who tried to set upon him; his life was saved by the intervention of Justinian, the nephew of the excubitores' commander and eventual emperor, Justin I (r. 518–527).

=== End of career ===
The last reference to Patricius occurs in November 519, when he was at Edessa, where he was sent to persuade its bishop to accept the Chalcedonian doctrines or abdicate voluntarily. Upon his refusal, Patricius forcibly deposed him and exiled him.

== Sources ==
- Greatrex, Geoffrey; Lieu, Samuel N. C. (2002). The Roman Eastern Frontier and the Persian Wars (Part II, 363–630 AD). New York and London: Routledge (Taylor & Francis). ISBN 0-415-14687-9.
- Martindale, John R., ed. (1980). The Prosopography of the Later Roman Empire: Volume II, AD 395–527. Cambridge: Cambridge University Press. ISBN 0-521-20159-4.

Preceded by Fl. Iohannes Gibbus	Consul of the Roman Empire; 500 with Fl. Hypatius	Succeeded by Fl. Avienus Iunior, Fl. Pompeius
