= Probus (consul 502) =

6th-century Eastern Roman consul

Probus (Greek: Πρόβος; fl. 502–542) was a politician of the Eastern Roman Empire and relative of the Emperor Anastasius I.

== Biography ==
Probus was the nephew of Eastern Roman Emperor Anastasius I and a cousin of the brothers Hypatius and Pompeius; he was probably the son of Paulus (consul in 496) and his wife Magna. According to some recent prosopographical studies, he might have married a daughter (b. ca 480) of Sabinianus (ca 460 - after 505), consul in 505, and had Flavius Anastasius Paulus Probus Sabinianus Pompeius (ca 500 - after 517), consul in 517.

He was a Monophysite and a friend of the monk Severus (who later became Patriarch of Antioch), whom Probus introduced to Anastasius when the former went to Constantinople, around 508.

In 502 he was appointed consul by the East court. In 519, during the investigation around Peter of Apamea, he was cheered along with Hypatius.

In 526 (when he had been probably appointed to the high office of magister militum, surely already a patricius) Probus was sent by the Emperor Justin I as the ambassador to the Huns; the emperor gave him money to hire Hunnic mercenaries to defend the Iberian region from the Persians, but Probus gave the money, with the consent of Justin, to the missionaries who worked among the Huns.

In 528 he was accused of slandering Emperor Justinian I; brought to trial before the consistory, the Emperor tore up the documentation and forgave Probus.

In January 532, Justinian faced a dangerous uprising, known to history as the Nika revolt. The rebels needed a candidate to the throne in opposition to Justinian, and Probus believed that, as a nephew of Anastasius, the people might choose him or one of his cousins, and for this reason he secretly withdrew from Constantinople. The rebels went to his house, near the port of Julian, and having not found him there, burned it; they then acclaimed Hypatius emperor. After quashing the revolt, Justinian executed Hypatius and banished Probus, confiscating their properties, but the following year he changed his mind and recalled Probus, restoring what was taken away.

Probus was still alive in 542, when he leased one of his houses to John of Ephesus.

== Bibliography ==
- Martindale, John R., ed. (1980). "Fl. Probus 8". The Prosopography of the Later Roman Empire: Volume II, AD 395–527. Cambridge: Cambridge University Press. pp. 912–913. ISBN 0-521-20159-4.

Political offices
| Preceded by Avienus, Pompeius | Consul of the Roman Empire; 502 with Rufius Magnus Faustus Avienus Junior | Succeeded by Volusianus, Dexicrates |
