= Theodorus (usurper) =

Roman usurper

Theodorus (Greek: Θεοδώρος) was a Roman usurper against Emperor Valens according to Ammianus Marcellinus. Marcellinus was residing in Antioch in 372 and, making it clear that he is speaking as an eyewitness, tells us that Theodorus was thought to have been identified by divination as a new Emperor, the successor to Valens. He proceeds and explain how Theodorus and several others were made to confess their deceit through the use of torture and were cruelly punished after that. Nothing else is known about him.

== Bibliography ==
- Kelly, Gavin. Ammianus Marcellinus: The Allusive Historian. Cambridge University Press, 2008, ISBN 978-0-521-84299-0.
