= Anastasian War =

Byzantine-Sassanid war (502–506)

- Part of the Byzantine–Sasanian Wars
- The Roman-Persian frontier had remained stable since 384, when the two powers divided Armenia, and despite recurrent warfare, would not change significantly until the Lazic War.
Date	502–506 AD
Location	Osroene, Upper Mesopotamia, Southeastern Anatolia (modern-day Turkey)
Result	Inconclusive
Territorial changes	Status quo ante bellum

Belligerents
Byzantine Empire; Arab allies	Sasanian Empire; Lakhmids

Commanders and leaders
Anastasius I; Areobindus; Patricius; Hypatius; Apion; Justin I; Patriciolus; Vitalian; Pharesmanes; Celer; Romanus; Constantine (POW); Godidisklus; Bessas; Rufinus; Asouades; Bonosus; Timostratus	Kavad I; Theodore; Al-Mundhir III ibn al-Nu'man; Adergoudounbades; Bawi; Glones †; Mirranes (Perozes?)

The Anastasian War was fought from 502 to 506 between the Byzantine Empire and the Sasanian Empire. It was the first major conflict between the two powers since 440, and would be the prelude to a long series of destructive conflicts between the two empires over the next century.

== Prelude ==
Several factors underlay the termination of the longest period of peace the Eastern Roman and the Sasanian Empire ever enjoyed. The Persian king Kavad I needed money to pay his debts to the Hephthalites who had helped him regain his throne in 498/499. The situation was exacerbated by recent changes in the flow of the Tigris in Lower Mesopotamia, sparking famines and flood. When the Roman emperor Anastasius I refused to provide any help, Kavad tried to gain the money by force.

== War ==
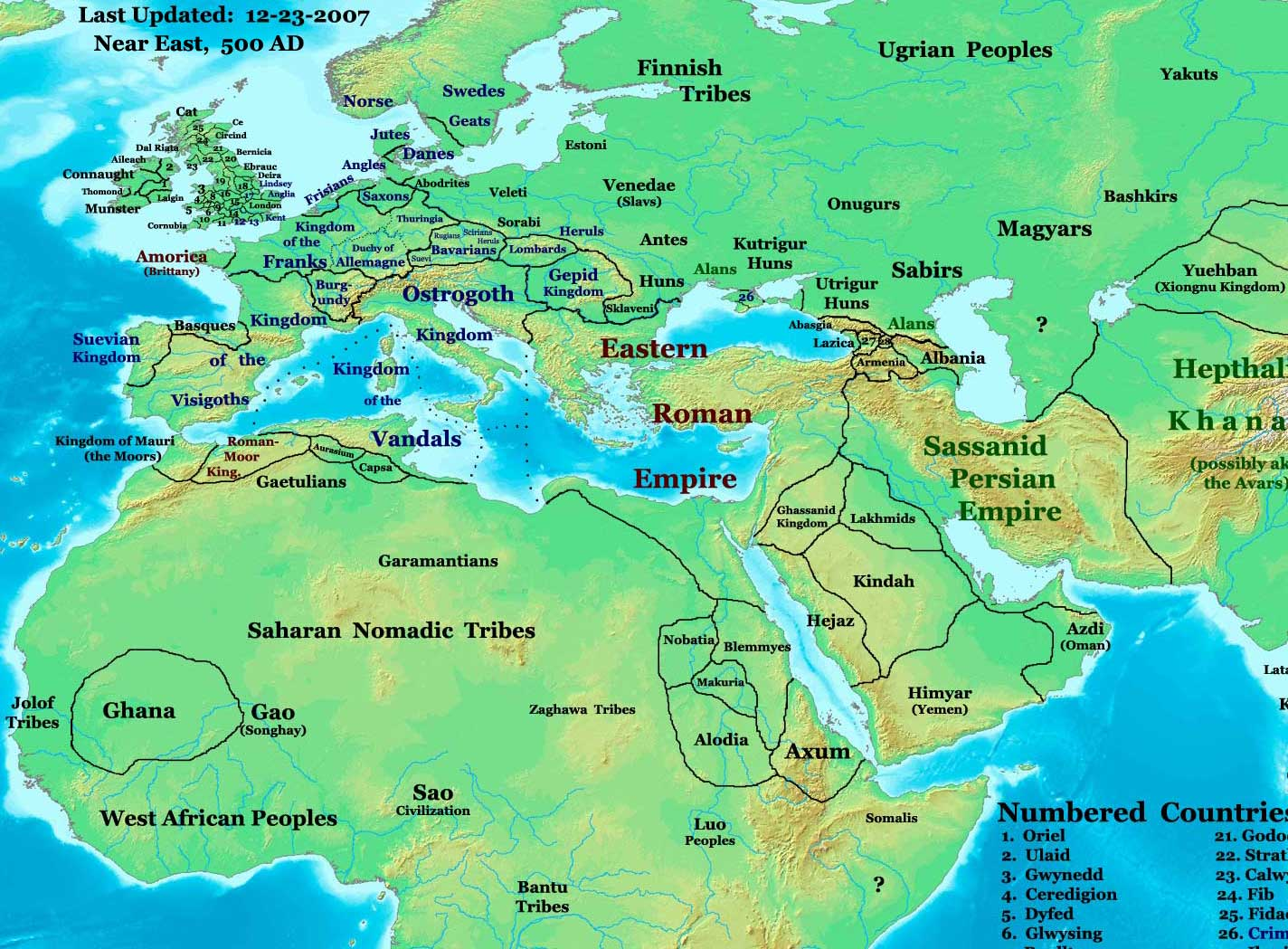
Roman and Persian Empires in 500, also showing their neighbors, many of whom were dragged into wars between the great powers.

=== Kavad's campaign of 502 ===
In 502, Kavad quickly captured the unprepared city of Theodosiopolis, perhaps with local support; the city was in any case undefended by troops and weakly fortified. Martyropolis also fell in the same year. Kavad then besieged the fortress-city of Amida through the autumn and winter (502-503) and captured it after a lengthy siege, although the defenders were unsupported by troops. Many people, particularly the population of Amida, were deported to Pars and Khuzestan in Persia, in particular, to the new city of Veh-az-Amid Kavad (Arrajan).

=== Anastasius' campaign of 503 and Kavad's counterattack ===
The Byzantine emperor Anastasius I dispatched an army in May 503 against the Sasanians. The army numbered 52,000 men, the largest Roman force in the East since Julian's invasion of Persia, and the largest assembled Roman army throughout the 6th century. The force gathered at Edessa and Samosata. It operated in three divisions under magister militum per Orientem Areobindus, strategos Patricius, and Hypatius. Hypatius and Patricius attacked Amida, which was held by a 3,000-strong garrison under Glones. Areobindus, together with Romanus and the Arab phylarch Asouades (Aswad) (probably a Kinda leader) attacked Nisibis, in which Kavad was residing. Procopius also mentions Celer as a fourth commander. Notable officers associated with this force include "hyparch" Apion I (the Egyptian), comes Justin (the future emperor), Patriciolus and his son Vitalian (who later revolted against Anastasius), the Colchian Pharesmanes, and the Goths Godidisklus and Bessas.

Initially, Areobindus gained the upper hand in Nisibis, but Kavad's counterattack defeated him, plundered his fort Apadna, and forced him to retreat westward; Hypatius and Patricius attempted to assist him, but it was too late. They failed to join with Areobindus and were decisively defeated between Apadna and Tell Beshme and retreated to Samosata. According to Zacharias, their cavalry suffered heavily during the retreat, falling from the cliffs of mountains. Kavad continued westward to Constantia but failed to capture it, though he received supplies from its inhabitants. In early September, Kavad reached near Edessa. Areobindus rejected Kavad's demand of 10,000 pounds (4,500 kg) of gold in exchange for peace. Sasanians and Lakhmids overran much of Osrhoene but attempts to attack the fortified city failed. Meanwhile, Byzantine forces under Pharesmanes attacked Amida, who killed the Sasanian commander Glones through cunning. This, together with Hunnic incursions, the arrival of Byzantine reinforcements, and Kavad's lack of supplies, all forced him to withdraw to Persia. This further contributed to the reputation of Edessa as being impregnable. Meanwhile, the dux of Osrhoene, Timostratus, defeated the Lakhmids, and the Tha'labites (Byzantine Arabs) attacked Lakhmid capital al-Hira.

=== Anastasius' renewed assault ===
In the summer of 503, Anastasius sent reinforcements under magister officiorum Celer and canceled taxes from Mesopotamia and Osrhoene, while Hypatius and Apion were recalled. Patricius moved to Amida, defeated a force sent against him, and invested the city; Celer joined him later in the spring of 504. While the siege was ongoing, Celer raided Beth Arabaye, while Areobindus raided Arzanene. Sasanian weakness at this point is apparent by defections to the Byzantine side by the renegade Constantine, a certain Arab chief Adid, and the Armenian Mushlek. The Byzantines eventually captured Amida.

=== Peace treaty ===
In the same year, an armistice was agreed as a result of an invasion of Armenia by the Huns from the Caucasus. Negotiations between the two powers took place, but such was the distrust that in 506 the Romans, suspecting treachery, seized the Persian officials; once released, the Persians preferred to stay in Nisibis. In November 506, a treaty was finally agreed, but little is known of what the terms of the treaty were. Procopius states that peace was agreed for seven years, and it is likely that some payments were made to the Persians. The Persians did not keep Byzantine territory and no annual tribute was paid so it seems the peace treaty was not harsh on the Byzantines.

== Aftermath ==
The Roman generals blamed many of their difficulties in this war on their lack of a major base in the immediate vicinity of the frontier, a role filled for the Persians by Nisibis (which until its secession in 363 had served the same purpose for the Romans), and in 505 Anastasius therefore ordered the building of a great fortified city at Dara. The dilapidated fortifications were also upgraded at Edessa, Batnae and Amida.

Although no further large-scale conflict took place during Anastasius's reign, tensions continued, especially while work continued at Dara. This construction project was to become a key component of the Roman defenses, and also a lasting source of controversy with the Persians, who complained that its construction violated the treaty agreed in 422, by which both empires had agreed not to establish new fortifications in the frontier zone. Anastasius, however, pursued the project, deflecting Kavad's complaints with money. The Persians were in any case unable to stop the work, and the walls were completed by 507/508.

== Sources ==
=== Primary ===
- Procopius; Dewing, H. B. (trans.) (1914). History of the Wars. Books I–II.

=== Secondary ===
- Greatrex, Geoffrey; Lieu, Samuel N. C. (2002). The Roman Eastern Frontier and the Persian Wars (Part II, 363–630 AD). New York, New York and London, United Kingdom: Routledge (Taylor & Francis). ISBN 0-415-14687-9.
