= Rufius Magnus Faustus Avienus =

Rufius Magnus Faustus Avienus was a politician of the Western Roman Empire. He was appointed consul for 502 with Flavius Probus as his colleague.

His father was Anicius Probus Faustus, who was the leading supporter of Pope Symmachus in the Laurentian schism, and his brother was Ennodius Messala, one of the consuls for 506. Avienus was later Praetorian prefect of Italy (527–528).

Political offices
Preceded by Avienus, Pompeius	Roman consul 502 with Flavius Probus	Succeeded by Volusianus, Dexicrates
