= Xiao Baojuan =

Xiao Baojuan 蕭寶卷
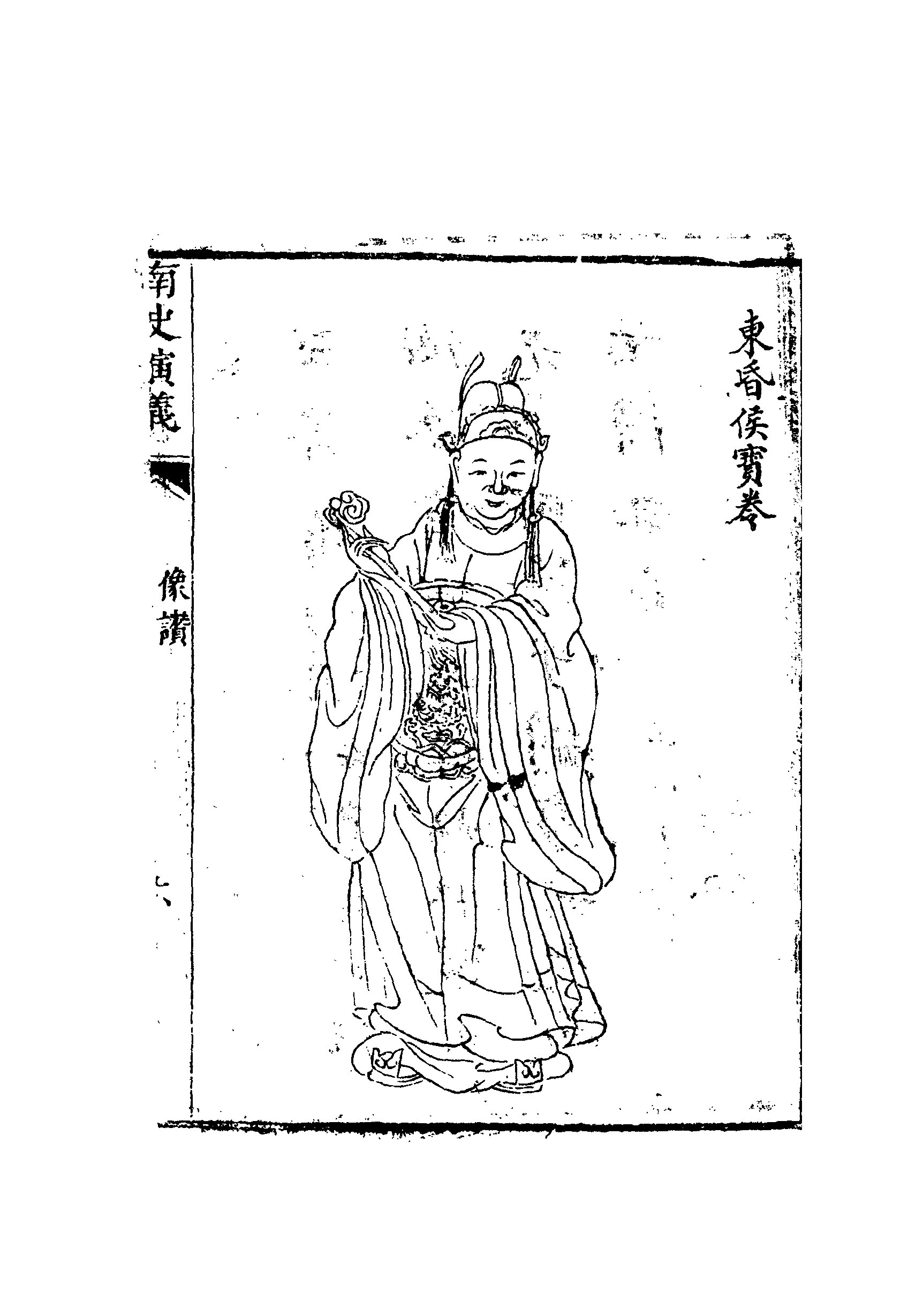

Emperor of Southern Qi
- Reign: September 498 – 31 December 501
- Predecessor: Emperor Ming
- Successor: Emperor He
- Born: Xiao Mingxian (蕭明賢); 483
- Died: 501 (aged 17–18)
- Spouse: Chu Lingqu; Consort Pan Yunu; Consort Wu; Consort Yu; Consort Huang Jinghui
Names
- Xiāo Bǎojuǎn (蕭寶卷)
Era name and dates
- Yǒngyuán (永元): 499-501
- Father: Emperor Ming
- Mother: Empress Liu Huiduan

Xiao Baojuan (蕭寶卷) (483 – 31 December 501), né Xiao Mingxian (蕭明賢), commonly known by his posthumously demoted title of Marquess of Donghun (東昏侯), courtesy name Zhizang (智藏), was an emperor of the Southern Qi dynasty of China, during the Northern and Southern dynasties period. He was a violent ruler who executed high-level officials at his whim, and this drew several major rebellions, the last of which, by his general Xiao Yan, overthrew him and eventually his dynasty, with Xiao Yan establishing the Liang dynasty. He is known as the Marquess of Donghun because Xiao Yan demoted him to that title after he was killed in a siege of the capital Jiankang.

== Background ==
Xiao Baojuan was born in 483, when his father Xiao Luan was a mid-high-level official and the Marquess of Xichang, as the cousin of Emperor Wu. His original name was Xiao Mingxian. He was Xiao Luan's second son, and his mother Liu Huiduan (劉惠端) was Xiao Luan's wife. (His only older brother Xiao Baoyi (蕭寶義) was born to Xiao Luan's concubine Lady Yin.) His mother Marchioness Liu had three other sons, Xiao Baoxuan (蕭寶玄), Xiao Baoyin, and Xiao Baorong, before dying in 489.

In 494, with Emperor Wu's frivolous and incompetent grandson Xiao Zhaoye as emperor and with Xiao Luan as his prime minister, Xiao Luan carried out a coup d'état and overthrew Xiao Zhaoye. (It was around this time that Xiao Baojuan's name was changed from Mingxian to Baojuan.) Xiao Luan initially made Xiao Zhaoye's younger brother Xiao Zhaowen emperor, but after further cementing his power, including killing many sons of both Emperor Wu and Emperor Wu's father Emperor Gao, Southern Qi's founding emperor, Xiao Luan took over the throne himself (as Emperor Ming). As Xiao Baojuan's older brother Xiao Baoyi was said to be severely disabled and unable to talk, Xiao Baojuan, as the second son and the oldest born of Xiao Luan's wife, was created crown prince.

== As crown prince ==
Not much is known about Xiao Baojuan's activities as crown prince. What is known was that Emperor Ming often told him about how Xiao Zhaoye had considered killing him, and warning him that he needed to act decisively. It was also said that he disliked studies but rather liked to spend time in games, and that he was an introvert who did not like to talk. In 495, his father gave the daughter of his official Chu Cheng (褚澄), Chu Lingqu, to him as his crown princess in marriage. In 496, he had a coming-of-age ceremony. In 498, during the rebellion of the retired general Wang Jingze (王敬則), despite the fact that Wang's army was some distance away from the capital Jiankang, Xiao Baojuan mistook a fire as a sign that Wang's army was near the capital and changed into a jumpsuit to try to flee, but subsequently Wang's army was defeated.

In fall 498, Emperor Ming died. Xiao Baojuan succeeded to the throne as emperor.

== Reign ==
Emperor Ming's will left a group of high-level officials in charge of the government—Xiao Baojuan's cousin Xiao Yaoguang (蕭遙光) the Prince of Shi'an, the prime minister Xu Xiaosi (徐孝嗣), the trusted Jiang Shi (江祏) and his brother Jiang Si (江祀), Xiao Baojuan's uncle Liu Xuan (劉暄), and the general Xiao Tanzhi (蕭坦之). Xiao Baojuan himself was anxious to exercise imperial authority, but often spent his time in games with his close associates, whom he often awarded money. The high-level officials, particularly Jiang Shi, tried to curb his behavior, and this brought great resentment from the young emperor, who was described as not liking meetings with officials but favored eunuchs, bodyguards, and messengers. He created his wife Crown Princess Chu empress, and created his only known son Xiao Song (蕭誦), by his concubine Consort Huang, crown prince.

With the young emperor's lack of virtues becoming evident, Jiang Shi began a discussion among high-level officials to depose him and to replace him with his younger brother Xiao Baoxuan the Prince of Jiangxia. However, Liu Xuan disliked Xiao Baoxuan, and Xiao Yaoguang used this to steer the discussion to making himself emperor. However, Liu opposed this as well, and Xiao Yaoguang, in 499, in anger, unsuccessfully tried to assassinate Liu, who then reported the plot to Xiao Baojuan. Xiao Baojuan immediately had Jiang Shi and Jiang Si arrested and executed. Xiao Yaoguang, in fear, feigned illness and resigned, but subsequently feared that Xiao Baojuan would execute him anyway, and started a rebellion, putting the palace under siege. Xiao Baojuan's forces, commanded by Xiao Tanzhi and two other generals, Zuo Xingsheng (左興盛) and Cao Hu (曹虎), counterattacked, and put Xiao Yaoguang's headquarters under siege, capturing and executing him.

In the aftermaths of Xiao Yaoguang's rebellion, Xiao Baojuan now controlled more power than before, and initially he promoted Xu Xiaosi, Xiao Tanzhi, Liu Xuan, Cao Hu, as well as the official Shen Wenji (沈文季), to reward them for their contributions and loyalty during Xiao Yaoguang's rebellion. However, less than a month later, Xiao Baojuan, upon reports by his associates who disliked Xiao Tanzhi, had him arrested and executed. Soon, the same fate fell Liu and Cao, and from this point on, the entire government was in fear, not knowing whom the emperor would next kill. Two months later, Xu and Shen, as well as Shen's nephew Shen Zhaolüe, were killed as well. Upon hearing how Xiao Baojuan was slaughtering the high-level officials, the senior general Chen Xianda (陳顯達), then the governor of Jiang Province (江州, modern Jiangxi and Fujian), started a rebellion, advancing quickly on Jiankang and reaching the outskirts of the capital in less than a month, around new year 500. However, Chen then died in battle, and his rebellion was defeated.

After Chen was defeated, Xiao Baojuan became even more arbitrary in his behavior. He liked to visit many places outside the palace, but did not like to have people see his face, and so would first send guards to expel people from their homes and business before heading to the location. Anyone who did not evacuate, either willfully or not, would be executed. By this point, the common people began to resent the emperor as well. In spring 500, in fear, the general Pei Zhaoye (裴叔業), the governor of Yu Province (豫州, modern central Anhui), surrendered the important city Shouyang to rival Northern Wei.

Xiao Baojuan sent the generals Cui Huijing (崔慧景) and Xiao Yi (蕭懿) to try to recapture Shouyang. However, as soon as he left the capital region, Cui announced that because of the emperor's violent character, he was starting a rebellion to overthrow the emperor. He persuaded Xiao Baojuan's brother Xiao Baoxuan to join him, and in just 12 days they reached the capital and put the palace under siege. Cui declared Xiao Baojuan be deposed as Prince of Wu. However, Cui, believing that victory was at hand, did not carry out the campaign diligently, and Xiao Baojuan sent messengers to recall Xiao Yi to try to save the capital. Xiao Yi advanced quickly back on the capital and defeated Cui, who fled but was killed during flight. Xiao Baoxuan was executed.

After Cui's death, Xiao Baojuan grew even more confident, and his associates quickly controlled the government. He favored his concubine Consort Pan Yunu, awarding her and her father Pan Baoqing (潘寶慶) with many things. Pan Baoqing often falsely accused other people of crimes and had them executed, seizing their property. Xiao Baojuan also carried out a large number of construction projects and often demanded tributes of luxury items from the people—and his associates used this opportunity to demand even more things, and the people grew weary.

To award Xiao Yi, Xiao Baojuan had made him prime minister after he defeated Cui Huijing, but he soon grew suspicious of Xiao Yi as well, and with his associates persuading him to, he soon forced Xiao Yi to commit suicide in winter 500. Xiao Yi's brother Xiao Yan, the governor of Yong Province (雍州, modern northwestern Hubei) thus declared a rebellion from his provincial capital Xiangyang. Xiao Baojuan sent the general Liu Shanyang (劉山陽) to attack Xiao Yan, but, in fear of a surprise attack from Liu Shanyang, Xiao Yingzhou (蕭穎冑), the chief of staff for Xiao Baojuan's brother Xiao Baorong, who served as the titular governor of Jing Province (荊州, modern central and western Hubei), instead joined Xiao Yan and surprised and killed Liu Shanyang. Both Xiao Yan and Xiao Yingzhou then declared that they wanted to overthrow Xiao Baojuan and make Xiao Baorong emperor. Xiao Yingzhou remained at Jiangling with Xiao Baorong, while Xiao Yan attacked east.

Xiao Yan's progress was not fast but was steady, and by spring 501 the western half of the empire was under the control of his forces. Meanwhile, Xiao Yingzhou had Xiao Baorong declared emperor (as Emperor He). For the next several months, then, Southern Qi had two emperors. Initially Emperor He nominally demoted Xiao Baojuan to commoner rank, and when his officials suggested Xiao Baojuan be created Marquess of Lingyang, he declined, instead he agreed their suggestion to create Xiao Baojuan Prince of Fuling. Meanwhile, two other Jiankang-based plots to kill Xiao Baojuan—one by his cousin Xiao Zhaozhou (蕭昭冑) the Prince of Baling (a grandson of Emperor Wu), and one by the general Zhang Xintai (張欣泰), failed. By winter 501, Xiao Yan had reached Jiankang and put the city under siege, but while he was initially successful in defeating Xiao Baojuan's forces, the city was initially ably defended by the generals Wang Zhenguo (王珍國) and Zhang Ji (張稷), and the siege stalled. Meanwhile, Xiao Yingzhou, who had maintained a balance of power with Xiao Yan, died of illness, and from this point, there was no doubt that Xiao Yan was in control of the rebellion.

Around the new year 501, Xiao Baojuan's associates told him that, in their opinion, it was because Wang Zhenguo and Zhang Ji were not wholehearted that Xiao Yan's army could not be defeated. Hearing of this, in fear, Wang and Zhang had Xiao Baojuan assassinated, and had his head presented to Xiao Yan. Xiao Baojuan was posthumously demoted to the title of Marquess of Donghun. Consort Pan and his other associates were executed, and Empress Chu and Crown Prince Song were both demoted to commoner rank. By 502, Xiao Yan had taken over the throne from Xiao Baorong as well and had ended Southern Qi and established Liang Dynasty.

== Family ==
- Empress, of the Chu clan of Henan (皇后 河南褚氏), personal name Lingqu (令璩)
- Noble Consort, of the Pan clan (貴妃 潘氏; d. 501), personal name Yu'er (玉儿) or (玉奴)
  - Unnamed daughter
- Noble Concubine, of the Huang clan (貴嬪 黃氏)
  - Xiao Song, Crown Prince (皇太子 蕭誦; d. 501), 1st son
- Consort, of the Wu clan (吳妃), personal name Jinghui (景暉)
  - Xiao Zan, Prince of Yuzhang of Southern Liang (南梁豫章王蕭贊; 501/502 – 531), believed himself to be 2nd son of Baojuan

== Ancestry ==
Xiao Chengzhi (384–447)
Xiao Daosheng (427–482)
Empress Dowager Gong
Emperor Ming of Southern Qi (452–498)
Jiang Zun
Empress Yi
Xiao Baojuan (483–501)
Liu Daohong
Liu Jingyou
Empress Mingjing (d. 489)
Lady Wang

Regnal titles
| Preceded by Emperor Ming of Southern Qi | Emperor of Southern Qi; 498–501 | Succeeded by Emperor He of Southern Qi |
