= Siege of Amida (502–503) =

Siege during the Anastasian War

- Part of the Anastasian War
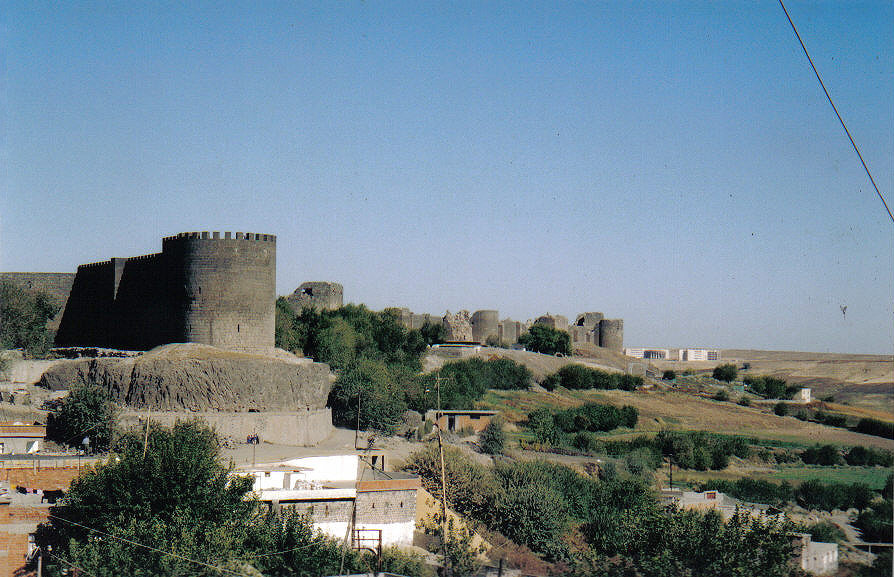
- The walls of Amida
Date	October 502 – January 503
Location	Amida (modern-day Diyarbakır, Turkey) 37.915°N 40.235°E
Result	Sasanian victory

Belligerents
Sasanian Empire	Byzantine Empire

Commanders and leaders
Kavadh I	Cyrus (WIA) (POW); Leontius (POW); Paul Bar Zainab (POW) (executed)

Casualties and losses
Unknown	80,000 (including civilians); Many were deported

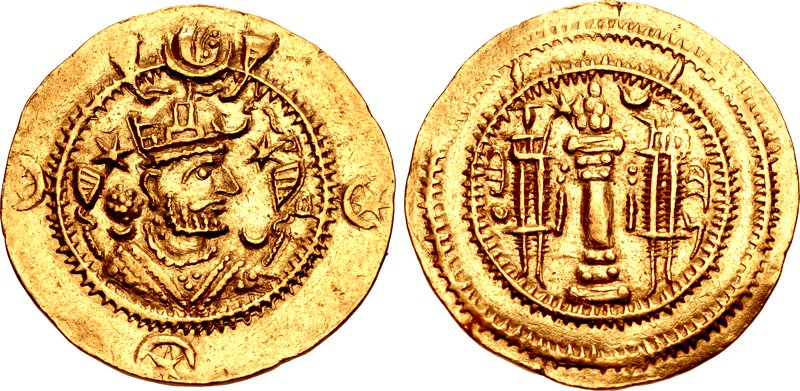
Gold dinar of the Sasanian King Kavadh I who besieged Amida

The siege of Amida took place between 502 and 503 during the Anastasian War, when the Sasanian Empire captured the city from the Byzantine Empire. The conflict was sparked after the Byzantine Emperor Anastasius I Dicorus refused a loan requested by the Sasanian Shah Kavadh I. Kavadh then sought to raise the money by pillaging the Byzantine frontier towns. Though Amida had no Byzantine military troops, the city resisted a three-month siege before falling to the Sasanians. The sack of the city involved three days of mass killings, and those who survived were subsequently enslaved. The loss of Amida prompted Anastasius to mount a military response, and the war continued until both sides agreed to a truce in 505, after which the city was restored to Byzantine control.

== Background ==
In 502, Sasanian King Kavadh I sought funds to repay his debts to the Hephthalites, who had helped restore him to the throne in 498/499. His difficulties were worsened by recent shifts in the course of the Tigris in lower Mesopotamia, which had caused widespread famine and flooding. Kavadh requested a loan from Byzantine Emperor Anastasius I Dicorus, who refused to offer assistance. Kavadh then took his army to obtain the money by raiding and pillaging Byzantine holdings.

In the summer of 502, Kavadh invaded Byzantine territories of Armenia and Mesopotamia with an army which included Armenian and Arab allies. He quickly captured the weakly fortified city of Theodosiopolis (present-day Erzurum), possibly with support from inside. The king did not harm the population because he was not insulted by them.

== Siege ==
Kavadh then besieged the fortress-city of Amida (present-day Diyarbakır) in October 502, which turned more challenging than he had expected. The city was well-fortified with walls of black basalt. The defenders were under the leadership of Cyrus, the praeses of Mesopotamia, Leontius, the chief councilor, and Paul Bar Zainab, the steward. Although the people of the Amida were not supported by military troops, they repelled the Sasanian assaults for three months. As the siege dragged on, food supplies dwindled and were strictly rationed. The fighting men received the remaining food and drink, while women survived on small amounts of barley, the flesh of the dead, and shoe leather.

Kavadh got distressed as winter set in, because the Sasanians struggled in their garments, and their bows were weakened by the damp air. The battering rams were also ineffective, as the defenders absorbed the blows with chained bundles of rushes. The defenders opened a breach from within, pulling in the attackers' mound material and propping the hollowed area with beams. Becoming confident in repulsing the besiegers, the defenders on the walls shouted insults and taunted Kavadh. Unable to make progress after repeated assaults, Kavadh opened negotiations with the defenders, requesting payment in exchange for lifting the siege. The defenders, however, demanded compensation for the food the Sasanian army had seized from the surrounding villages.

The siege ended in January 503, when the besieging army discovered a weak point in the walls. Kavadh sent a small squad to breach them at night. According to contemporary historian Procopius, the Sasanians had a stroke of luck in their attempt; the guards at the walls were drunk and fell asleep after celebrating a festival, allowing the Sasanians to quietly scale the walls and capture one of the towers. The defenders attempted to resist the invaders but failed. In the battle, Cyrus was pierced by an arrow and withdrew from the battle. The following day the Sasanians stormed into the city.

== Aftermath ==
Contemporary historian Zacharias Rhetor detailed the fall and sack of the city. For three days, the Sasanian army pillaged and killed the people of the city, until a priest went to meet Kavadh and begged him to stop the killing. Kavadh asked him why they were fighting against him, the priest replied: "Because God willed to give Amida to you not by our decision but by your valour." Then, Kavadh ordered the slaughter to stop but allowed his men to continue the plunder of the city and enslave the survivors, some of whom were deported to Persia. Paul Bar Zainab was killed after the fall of the city. Kavadh also ordered Leontius and Cyrus to wear filthy garments with ropes around their necks, and carry pigs, saying while exhibiting them, "Rulers who do not rule their city well nor restrain its people, so that they do not insult the king, deserve such insult as this."

In May 503, Anastasius, reacting to the news of Amida's fall, sent a 52,000-strong army to recover and protect the Byzantine eastern frontier. The Byzantines chose to starve the defenders of Amida into submission rather than launching a direct assault. The city surrendered as part of a truce in 505 (ransomed for 1,000 pounds of gold), because the Byzantine army had invaded Sasanian territory. While the two leaders were concluding a peace treaty, the Byzantines reinforced the fortifications of cities besieged by the Sasanians, including Amida. The peace treaty was for seven years with no exchange of territories.
