= Nika riots =

532 Byzantine revolt against Justinian I

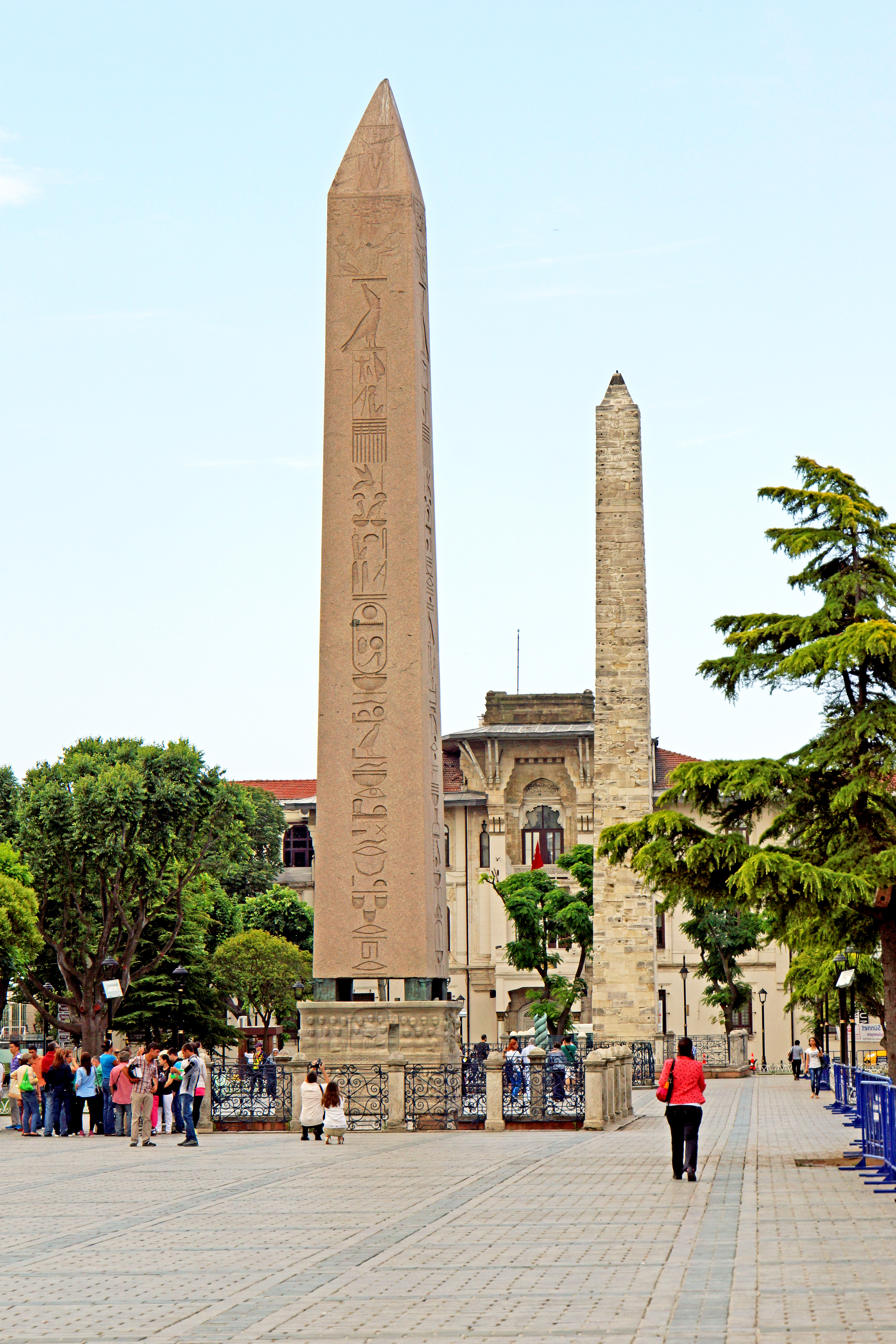
- Site of the Hippodrome of Constantinople in Istanbul
- Date: January 532 AD
- Location: Constantinople
- Caused by: See causes
- Goals: Free demes' leaders, overthrow Justinian
- Methods: Widespread rioting, property damage, murder, arson
- Result: Military action by imperial government leading to the escalation and militarization of the riots

Parties
Byzantine Empire	Blues; Greens

Lead figures
Justinian I; Theodora; Belisarius; Mundus; Narses	Hypatius (executed)	Pompeius (executed); Some senators

Casualties
- Deaths: 30,000 rioters killed

The Nika riots (Greek: Στάσις τοῦ Νίκα, romanized: Stásis toû Níka), Nika revolt or Nika sedition took place against Byzantine emperor Justinian I in Constantinople over the course of a week in 532 AD. They are often regarded as the most violent riots in the city's history, with nearly half of Constantinople being burned or destroyed and as many as thirty thousand people being killed, accounting for 5-10% of the population.

== Background ==
The Roman Empire had well-developed associations known as demes, which supported the different factions (or teams) to which competitors in certain sporting events belonged, especially in chariot racing. There were initially four major factions in chariot racing, differentiated by the colour of the uniform in which they competed; the colours were also worn by their supporters. The factions were the Blues (Veneti), the Greens (Prasini), the Reds (Russati), and the Whites (Albati), although by the 6th century the only teams with any influence were the Blues and the Greens. Emperor Justinian I (r. 527–565) originally supported the Blues, although his support for the faction abated during the early years of his reign, taking a more neutral stance as he looked to limit the power of the factions. It may be no coincidence that when the emperor treated the factions more equally, they became more inclined to unite; indeed, Justinian's previous ardent support of the Blues made him seem biased and contributed to his waning control of the capital leading up to 532.

The demes had become a focus for various social and political issues for which the general Byzantine population lacked other forms of outlet. They combined aspects of street-gangs with taking positions on claimants to the throne. They frequently tried to affect imperial policy by chanting political demands between races. Late Antiquity saw a crowd culture which utilised synchronised chanting in settings outside the races too (e.g. theatre, church) to convey ideological messages from the populace to the state, to whom these were an accepted indicator for public sentiment. On the other side, the emperor could appeal to the demes and legitimize their political actions in order to gain their support, and group acclamations could strengthen the bond between the emperor and the people. By the Sixth Century both teams had become increasingly violent, with tensions often leading to deadly confrontations between the factions.

In 531 AD the city prefect Eudaimon had some members of the Blues and Greens arrested for murder in connection with deaths during rioting after a chariot race. As a popular sport across the Empire the chariot races occasionally saw faction-fuelled rioting with some resulting in arson or murder, such as riots carried out by the Greens during the reign of Anastasius I. The murderers were to be executed, and most of them were. However, on January 10, 532, two of them, a Blue and a Green, survived execution, as the scaffolding and wood broke on them. Hearing this, monks from the monastery of St. Conon took the two partisans across to the church of St. Laurence, where they were put under surveillance by the prefect's troops.

Justinian was nervous: he was in the midst of negotiating with the Persians over peace in the east at the end of the Iberian War, and now he faced a potential crisis in his own capital city. Therefore, he declared that a chariot race would be held on January 13 and commuted the sentences to imprisonment. The Blues and the Greens responded by demanding that the two men be pardoned. When Justinian ignored their pleas, both factions united under the phrase "Nika" or "victory" and took to rioting (see Riots for more detail).

== Causes ==
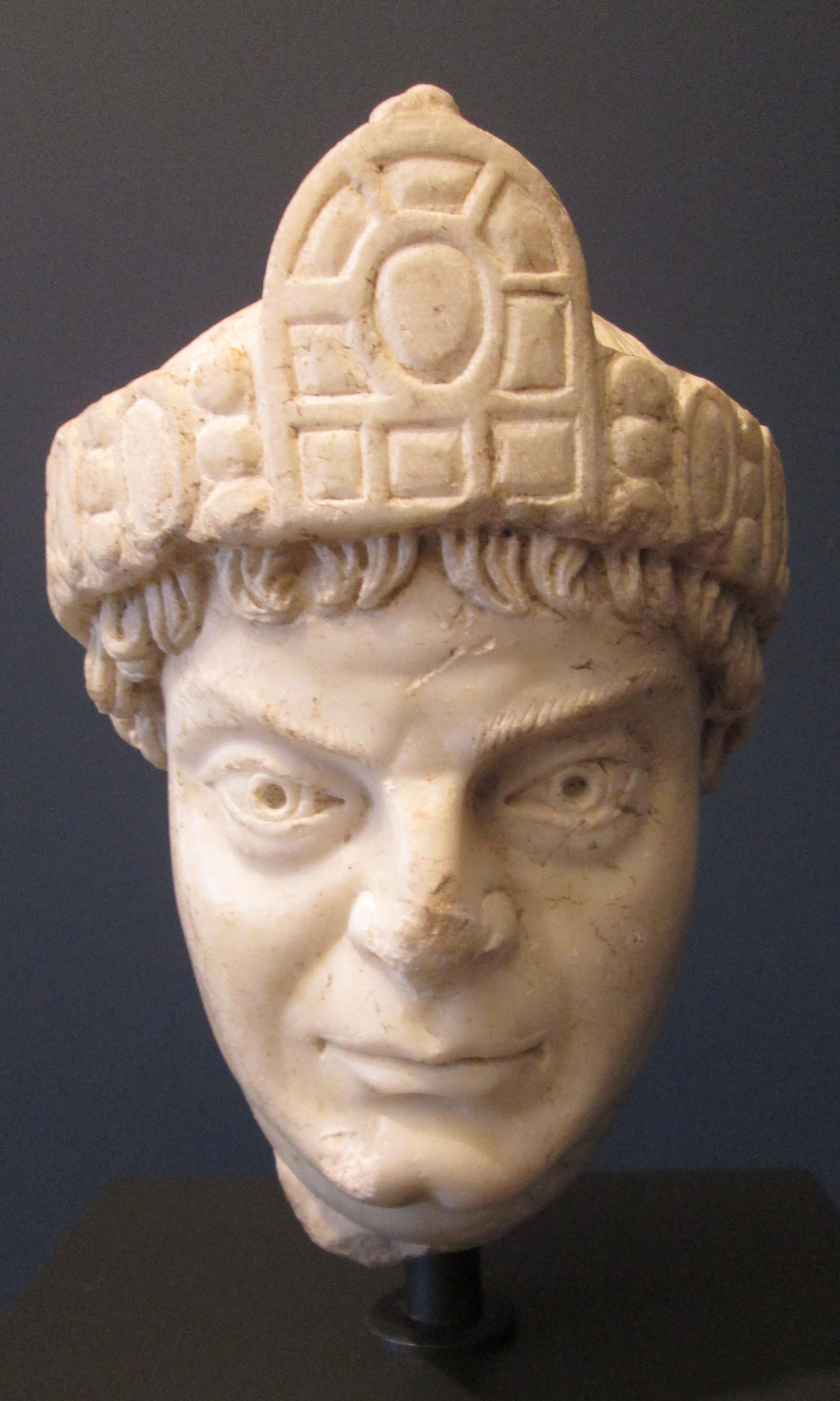
A 6th-century head of an emperor at the Getty Villa, thought to represent Justinian

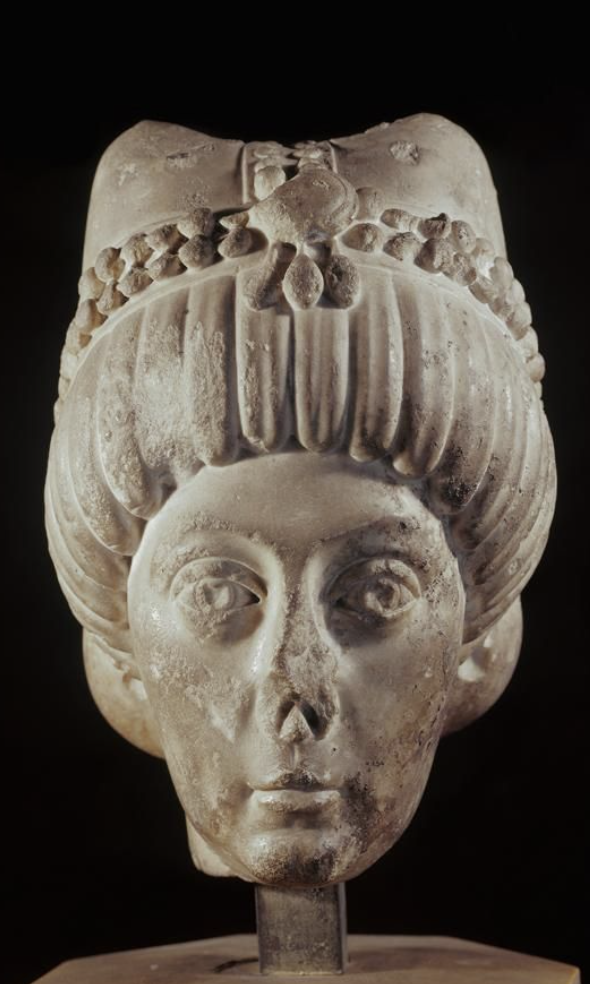
A 6th-century head of an empress at the Castello Sforzesco, thought to represent Theodora

Justinian, along with his prominent officials John the Cappadocian and Tribonian, faced significant public disapproval due to the implementation of high tax rates, allegations of corruption against the latter two officials, and John's reported harsh treatment of debtors. Justinian and John also reduced expenditure on the civil service and took steps to combat corruption within the civil service. John was particularly unfavourable among the senatorial elites, who were hit hard by John's new taxation policy which targeted the wealthiest in society, likely leading to senatorial influence within the riots. Justinian also took steps to diminish the influence of both teams. This was perceived by the Greens as an oppressive action akin to the reforms implemented in the civil service, while the Blues felt a sense of betrayal. The Roman legal code was widely perceived as a marker that distinguished the civilised Romans from "barbarians" (Latin: barbari). The law code was also religiously important as the Romans were believed to be "chosen by God", it being a symbol of justice. As a result, the successful implementation of significant legal reforms by an emperor was viewed as lending legitimacy to their reign, while a lack of progress in this area was interpreted as a sign of divine displeasure. What had taken nine years for the Theodosian code took Justinian just thirteen months.

However, prior to the Nika riots of January 532, the pace of legal reforms had significantly slowed. Concurrently, Justinian was engaged in an unsuccessful war against the Sasanian Empire. While initial Byzantine victories at Dara in the spring of 530 and Satala in the summer of 530 had temporarily enhanced his legitimacy, the defeat at Callinicum in 531 and the deteriorating strategic situation had a detrimental effect on his reputation. The legal reforms were met with resistance from the aristocracy from their inception, as they eliminated the ability to utilize obscure laws and jurisprudence to evade unfavorable judgments. As a result, Justinian's decision to ignore the factions' pleas to grant amnesty to the two individuals arrested in connection with the riots further exacerbated the anger and resentment towards the emperor, causing the factions to become more violent in their methods, setting fires and indiscriminately attacking imperial guards. Another cause that might have added to the intensity of the riots was the fact that the power of these factions had gone unchecked for a long time under Justin, with Justinian then strengthening their rivalries by supporting a specific faction. Furthermore, the fact that activity towards the factions had largely been unrestricted for three decades prior to Justin's reign, meant the likelihood of them working together in common cause was far greater. Their almost unrestrained force, combined with any resentment they held against the Emperor, is believed to have led to the Nika riots of 532 AD. Similarly, it was rare for the two factions to begin working together in this manner and for them to militarise, both of which added to the severity of the uprising. Their anger was often directed at each other, making unification all the more significant.

The Hippodrome provided an important setting which enabled popular mobilisation in Constantinople. Large numbers of people gathered in this public space, this gave the ability to express their collective grievances of both social and political issues. The Nika riots in 532 AD allowed the Blues and Greens, who were usually rivals, to unite about their opposition to the emperor and demand imperial policy changes. The large scale of this protest may have contributed to the rapid escalation of the protest however, the extent to which the riots were planned is often debated by historians.

== Riots ==
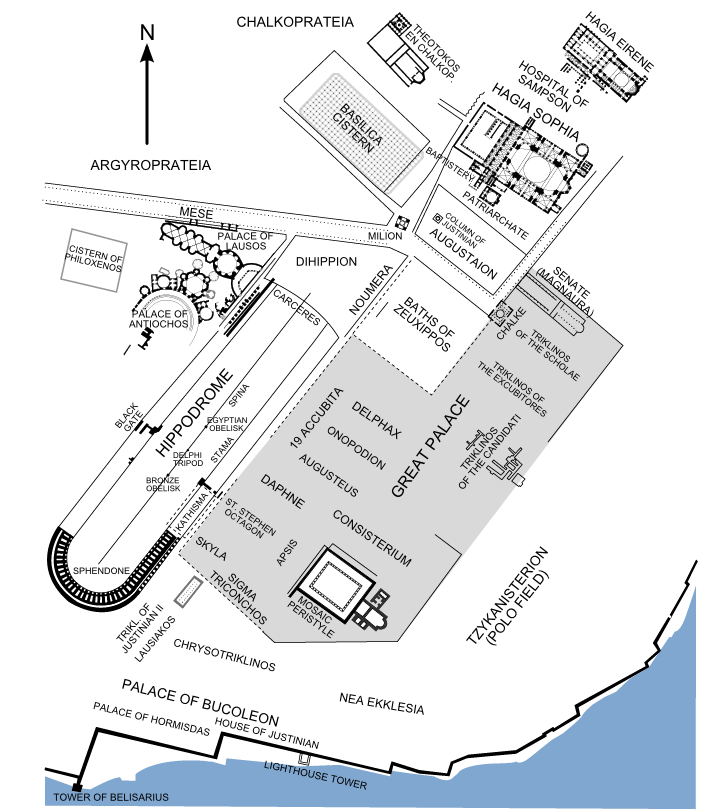
A map of the palace quarter, with the Hippodrome and the Hagia Sophia

The timeline provided for these riots is not exact, and it is derived from different sources, including one by John Malalas, (Note: Also followed by Theophanes AM 6024) and one by Procopius.

Initially, the riots were unlikely to have had the end goal of deposing Justinian, with the early days of the riots being a more extreme show of typical factional vandalism and hooliganism that was exacerbated by the emotional response to the escaped Blue and Green criminals, with the aim to have the arrested rioters released. This is not the first time that two major factions had joined forces: once under Anastasius and once under Justin. Usually, riots were more "conservative in nature" and were used to keep the emperor accountable and make him aware of the will of the people. However, in the case of the Nika riots, the populace was not mollified by Justinian's hollow promises of change and were likely fueled by opportunistic senatorial intervention to shift focus to Justinian's deposition. These riots shared common characteristics with others during this period. However, they stand out due to the extent of militarisation. Common behaviour prior to this riot included the throwing of stones, which had been banned by Justinian in his anti-rioting decree of 527. The factions armed themselves to an extent unprecedented in other riots which explains the rapid increase in tensions. Previous riots still contained a great deal of brutality, but rarely with such organised ferocity from the rioters and direct military action from the regime.

On January 13, 532, an angry crowd arrived at the Hippodrome for the races. The Hippodrome was next to the palace complex, so Justinian could preside over the races from the safety of his box in the palace. From the start, the crowd hurled insults at Justinian. By the end of the day, at race 22, the partisan chants had changed from "Blue" or "Green" to a unified Nίκα ("Nika", meaning "Win!", "Victory!" or "Conquer!"), and the crowds broke out and began to assault the palace. The riot lasted for a week. Fires started during the tumult destroyed much of the city, including the city's foremost church, the Hagia Sophia (which Justinian would later rebuild).

It is believed that on January 14, the second day of the riots, Justinian, rather than negotiating political concessions, offered to host more races and games in an attempt to appease the rioters. This did little to halt the violence however, with the crowd ignoring his pleas for a suspension of the hostilities. In the past, emperors had cancelled races on account of them exacerbating tensions and worsening factional violence.

The rioters demanded that Justinian dismiss the prefect John the Cappadocian and the quaestor Tribonian. To de-escalate the situation, Justinian accepted their demands. In a final attempt to persuade the rioters to desist, Justinian carried a Bible and apologised to the crowd (an imitation of Anastasius' successful attempt to subdue the Staurotheis riot in 512 CE) , taking responsibility for not paying attention during the races, and promising amnesty to the rioters in return for peace. However, many in the crowd did not accept his apology. Those who did not support Justinian called for Hypatius, a nephew of former Emperor Anastasius I, to take his place as Emperor. It was unusual for imperial concessions to be unsuccessful in placating incensed factions in a culture where the monarchy had a history of appeasement. However, Justinian's early reign was marked by ignorance to legitimate grievances from his subjects, and thus the riots escalated. The rioters then declared Hypatius as Emperor. Different sources say that Hypatius might have had an arrangement with Justinian to bring the crowd into the hippodrome. But according to some traditions, he was incorrectly told by the Emperor's doctor that Justinian had left the palace and enjoyed being proclaimed emperor, a ruse to deceive Hypatius' apprehension. Procopius writes that the factions carried Hypatius away from his home and called him emperor against his and his wife's wishes.

Justinian considered fleeing, but his wife Theodora is said to have dissuaded him, saying, "Those who have worn the crown should never survive its loss. Never will I see the day when I am not saluted as empress." She is also credited, by Procopius, with adding, "[W]ho is born into the light of day must sooner or later die; and how could an Emperor ever allow himself to be a fugitive." Although an escape route across the sea lay open for the emperor, Theodora insisted that she would stay in the city, quoting an ancient saying, "Royalty is a fine burial shroud," or perhaps, "[the royal colour] Purple makes a fine winding sheet." However, Theodora's speech as quoted by Procopius can be viewed as representative of the discussions which took place in the palace rather than literal. His wording may have subtly indicated feelings of Justinian ruling as a tyrant, by indirectly quoting Dionysius of Syracuse who was to have said that "tyranny made a good winding sheet". Procopius further denounces Justinian and Theodora in his Secret History, this perhaps being a precursor to his true feelings. Nevertheless, Clemens Koehn presents evidence for Justinian having left the palace during the final days of the riot, whether from panic or with purpose, and returning shortly before or during the events at the Hippodrome.

Justinian now knew that decisive action was required, and plans were made to attack the Hippodrome, and to reach it through the Blues’ stoa. Justinian conceived of a plan that involved the eunuch Narses and the generals Belisarius and Mundus. Carrying a bag of gold given to him by Justinian, the slightly built eunuch entered the Hippodrome alone and unarmed. Narses went directly to the Blues' section, where he approached the important Blues and reminded them that Justinian supported them over the Greens. After he distributed the gold, the Blue leaders would consult quietly together and then address their followers. In the middle of Hypatius' coronation, the pro-Justinianic Blues separated off, leading the Greens to hurl stones at them. Belisarius had planned on entering the kathisma from the palace; however this plan went awry when his own soldiers refused to open the gates to him. He was thus forced to enter at the northern end of the Hippodrome, with his commanders following suit. Then, the troops led by Belisarius, Mundus, and Constantiolus stormed into the Hippodrome, with Belisarius capturing Hypatius and Pompeius while Mundus killed any remaining people indiscriminately, whether they were Blues or Greens.

== Aftermath ==
According to the account of Procopius, around 30,000 people were killed, although many likely died as result of trampling in the chaos of the riot rather than at the hands of the soldiers. According to Procopius, Hypatius and Pompeius maintained their innocence and argued that their detention was an injustice. Despite this Justinian had Hypatius and Pompeius executed and exiled the senators who had supported the riot. He also confiscated properties of senators that stood against him. However, he later re-issued titles and land to Hypatius' and Pompeius' children, while some of the officials Justinian dismissed in response to the demands of the rioters, like John the Cappadocian were reinstated to their prior positions.

He subsequently rebuilt Constantinople and the Hagia Sophia. In addition, Justinian used the rather quick suppression of the riots as a major victory in what was presented as a de facto civil war. Justinian did this by purely focusing on the actions of Hypatius and Pompeius. This focused on the final chain of events leading up to the riots and left out Justinian's failure to communicate with his people. However, the crushing of the Nika riots did not end the factions' violence. Indeed, in 565 – the last year of Justinian's reign – fighting once again became so serious that the city prefect Julian had to purge the factions to restore peace.

== Interpretations ==
The causes and the accounts of the riots are debated. Geoffrey Greatrex offers the most common view that Justinian's miscommunication, indecisiveness and inconsistency with the circus factions caused and escalated the riots. But it has been posited that had his predecessors shown the same lack of consistency, they too could have been subjected to a "Nika" riot. It is the view of Mischa Meier that Justinian might have intentionally provoked the riots so that his political rivals within the senate, like Hypatius might reveal themselves to him. However, Rene Pfeilschifter rejects this argument, considering it radical. J.A.S. Evans posit the view that the riots had no single cause, and that factors such as Justinian's reforms, senatorial discontentment and the aggrievement of the Blues and Greens all contributed to the outbreak of the riots. Peter Sarris also offers the view that Justinian's shifting attitude towards the factions had ignited the riot, but the Constantinopolitan political class had exploited and exacerbated the riots as well. Feeney seeks to reconsider Justinian's response to the riots by comparing it to that of modern autocracies, and believes that the imperial answer to such occurrences consisted of concessions and coercion, supported by the existing culture of ratifying the influence of factions to legitimise imperial rule. He interprets the Nika riots as an example of how the institutions that support an emperor's legitmacy can also threaten their rule if they oppose and mobilise against him. Clemens Koehn argues that the Nika rioters exhibited unusually militarised behaviour, deliberately seeking weapons and coordinating their actions more like soldiers than a spontaneous urban mob, demonstrated by the 250 Greens heading towards the palace wearing armour. Koehn also re-examines the sequence of events and argues that Justinian may indeed have temporarily withdrawn from the palace during the height of the riots, interpreting this as evidence of the emperor’s limited control rather than deliberate strategy. (Note: This is because some sources, such as the Chronicon Paschale, state Hypatius was told by a doctor within the palace that Justinian had left.) The motive for departure, whether it happened or not, is contested; Theophanes believes it was due to panic, whereas Westbrook suggests Justinian hoped to get fresh troops garrisoned in Thrace. Other historians had also noted the militancy of the Green Faction.

Most scholars believe that the timeline provided is derived from two diverging traditions, including one by John Malalas and one by Procopius. Procopius provides an insider perspective from the palace while Malalas recounts the Nika riots as an outsider of the events in the city. Procopius, as a legal advisor to Belisarius, might have enhanced Belisarius' role. Recent scholarship has further developed this distinction. Clemens Koehn highlights how Procopius' Wars employs dramatic and rhetorical strategies that may distort the chronology, while Malalas offers a civic perspective shaped by local loyalties. He infers that Procopius' account should be treated with caution and not regarded as the sole authoritative version of the riot. Koehn also reassesses Procopius' portrayal of the riot’s conclusion, suggesting that the intervention of Belisarius, Mundus, and Narses, though a result of Justinian’s rapid reaction to the crisis, may not have been part of a carefully premeditated imperial plan, but rather a hastily coordinated response once the Blues turned against Hypatius.

== General and cited sources ==
- Diehl, Charles (1972). Theodora, Empress of Byzantium. Frederick Ungar Publishing, Inc. ISBN 0-8044-1230-8. Popular account based on the author's extensive scholarly research.
- Weir, William (2004). 50 Battles That Changed the World: The Conflicts That Most Influenced the Course of History. Savage, Md: Barnes and Noble Books. ISBN 0-7607-6609-6.
