= Res gestae (Ammianus Marcellinus) =

Historical work by Ammianus Marcellinus covering Roman history from 96 to 378 AD

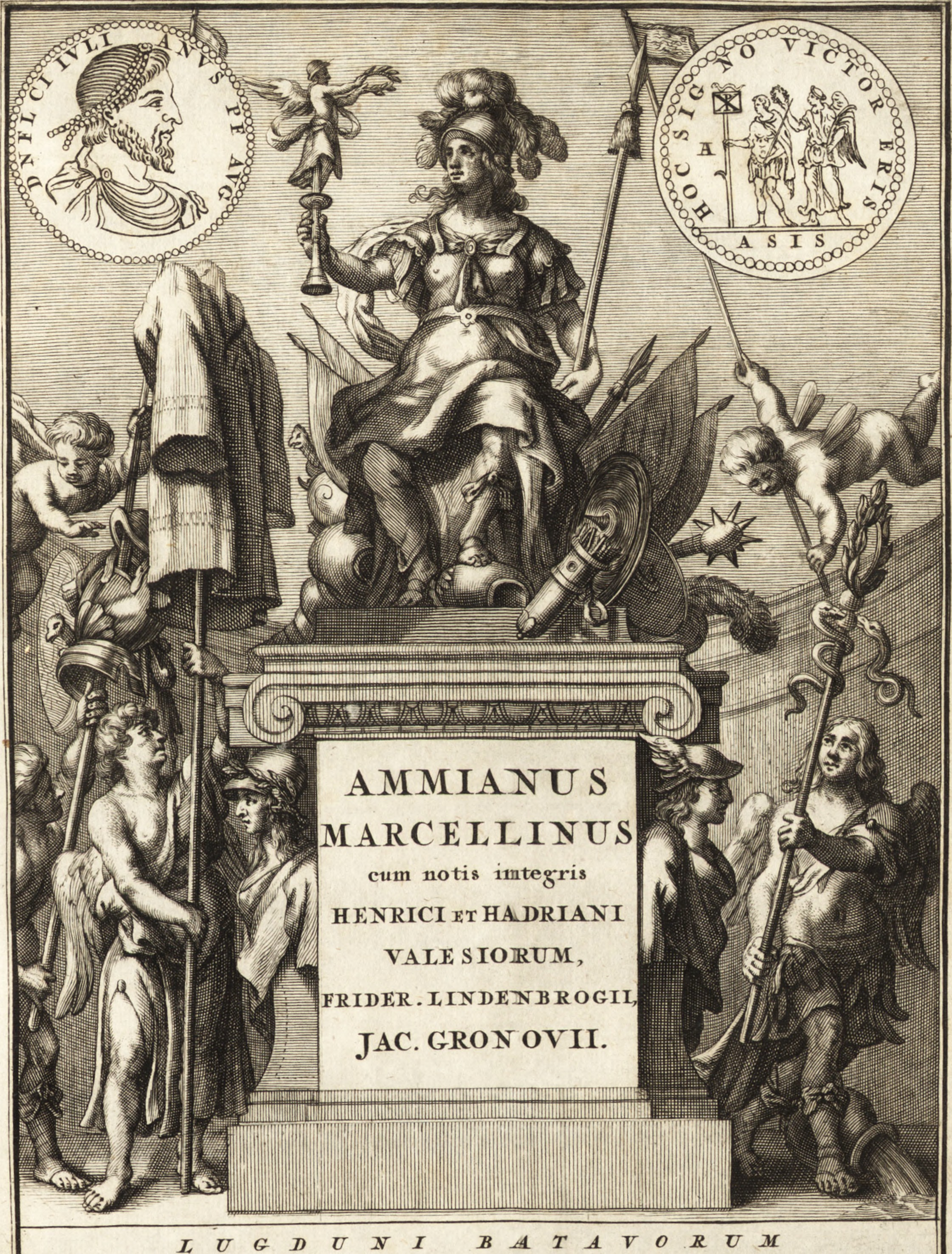
- Frontispiece of the 1693 edition
- Author: Ammianus Marcellinus
- Language: Latin
- Genre: History
- Publication place: Roman Empire

The Rerum gestarum libri XXXI (commonly abbreviated as Res gestae) is a historical work written by the Roman officer Ammianus Marcellinus beginning around 380 and likely completed by 392.

The title is not original. The term Res gestae was later used by Priscian of Caesarea. and translates to "The Things Accomplished." The manuscript Vaticanus Latinus 1873 labels it Rerum gestarum libri, though a more accurate title might be Rerum gestarum libri ab excessu Neruae.

== Content ==
These events, as a former soldier and a Greek, I have set forth to the best of my ability, from the reign of Emperor Nerva to the death of Valens; never, I believe, have I knowingly dared to tarnish my work, which professes truth, with silences or falsehoods. Let others, more skilled than I, in the prime of their age and learning, write the rest.

— Ammianus Marcellinus, Rerum gestarum libri, XXXI, 16, 9

Part of the 31 books of the work was published in 391, while those from Book XXVI onward appeared in subsequent years, possibly by 394. Many scholars suggest a later date, with evidence indicating Books XX to XXII were released between 388 and 390. Only Books XIV to XXXI survive, covering the period from 353 to 378, during which Ammianus, as a member of the imperial guard, was an eyewitness. In 1998, Timothy Barnes proposed that the Res Gestae were organized in groups of six books, with the surviving ones being Books XIX to XXXVI. Others argue for groupings of three, particularly Books XXIII–XXV, which focus on Julian.

Ammianus blends imperial biographies with a history of the Roman Empire. Each reign’s chronological account follows a concise introduction to the emperor, interspersed with numerous "digressions" providing background on specific topics. The narrative is detailed, assessing the virtus (virtues) and vitia (vices) of each ruler. While Ammianus briefly covers the period from Nerva to Julian, his prose becomes more expansive from Book XV onward. Events up to Book XXV are arranged chronologically, while from Book XXVI, the organization shifts to a geographical basis. Drawing on Tacitus, Ammianus strives for impartiality—sine ira et studio (without anger or bias)—more than most ancient historians, though not without some prejudice.

=== Structure ===
The work chronicles Roman history from Nerva’s rise (96 AD) to Valens’s death at the Battle of Adrianople (378 AD). As the author intended, it continues the narrative of Tacitus’s Histories, written three centuries earlier. Originally comprising thirty-one books, as the title suggests, the first thirteen are lost. The surviving eighteen books span from Magnentius’s defeat by Constantius II (353) to the Battle of Adrianople (378). Specifically, Book XIV addresses Constantius Gallus, Books XV–XXI cover Julian before his imperial reign, followed by Books XXII–XXV dedicated to his rule. The final six books narrate scattered military events.

The structure follows this outline:

- Books XIV–XVI: The fall of Constantius Gallus. Julian’s appointment as Caesar in Gaul and his early successes;
- Books XVII–XIX: Julian secures the Rhine frontier. In the East, Constantius II battles the Persians;
- Books XX–XXII: Julian is proclaimed Augustus in Gaul. Death of Constantius II, leaving Julian sole emperor;
- Books XXIII–XXV: Expedition against the Persians and Julian’s death. The brief reign of Jovian;
- Book XXVI: Valentinian I and Valens divide the empire;
- Books XXVII–XXX: Valentinian’s campaigns and death; Valens’s reign in the East;
- Book XXXI: The Goths flee the Huns and settle in the Roman Empire. Battle of Adrianople.

Though fragmentary details exist about the books before XIV, their content remains speculative. Ammianus notes that 2nd-century events were covered earlier, likely in condensed form for later elaboration. John F. Matthews suggests the lost books served as an introduction to the period Ammianus personally witnessed.

=== Book XIV ===
Book XIV opens with the downfall of Constantius Gallus, appointed Caesar of the eastern empire by his relative Constantius II, whom Ammianus portrays in a harshly negative light. After mishandling various matters, Gallus was denounced, recalled, and executed. Ammianus describes Gallus’s wife, Constantina, as "a mortal fury".

Ammianus is a key source on the rivalry between the Roman Empire and the Sasanian Empire under Shapur II, having participated in these conflicts. He details the 358 diplomatic exchanges between Rome and Persia, vividly recounting Shapur II’s 359 invasion, the siege and fall of Amida, and Julian’s 363 Persian campaign. He critiques Constantius II’s defensive strategy, favoring Julian’s offensive approach, despite its defeat at Ctesiphon, noting Constantius’s relative effectiveness.

=== Julian and Constantius ===
Ammianus harshly judges Constantius II, deploring his paranoia over conspiracies and exaggerated responses. He criticizes Constantius’s foreign policy and the influence of his empress (notably his second wife Eusebia) and court eunuchs. His assessment of Constantius’s civil wars is equally severe. Yet, he praises Constantius’s economic policies and dedication to state and army, though his overall verdict remains negative.

In contrast, Ammianus lauds Julian, the last pagan emperor and the work’s hero. Despite minor criticisms, Julian embodies Ammianus’s ideal ruler. Ammianus may have met Julian in Gaul, where the young Caesar, appointed by Constantius II, successfully fought the Alemanni and fortified the border. Ammianus admires Julian’s Gallic conquests, overlooking his dishonorable treatment of generals Ursicinus and Marcellus. Julian’s 360 proclamation as emperor, sparked by Constantius’s request for legions to aid his Persian campaign, is depicted as a spontaneous act by Gallic troops, though it was likely an orchestrated usurpation.

=== Conclusion ===
After Julian’s death, Book XXV briefly covers Jovian’s reign and the Perso–Roman Peace Treaty of 363, which Ammianus deems "most shameful" and "ignoble". Book XXVI details the joint reign of Valentinian I and Valens. Subsequent books trace Valentinian’s victorious campaigns against the Germanic peoples, up to Theodosius the Elder’s suppression of an African revolt. In the East, Valens struggles, while Valentinian earns cautious praise for limited military success and religious tolerance, possibly contrasting with Theodosius I’s establishment of Christianity without systematic pagan persecution.

Book XXXI narrates the Huns’ invasion—a primary source for Ammianus—the Greuthungi’s decline, the Visigoths’ Danube crossing, and their settlement request. The work concludes with the Gothic uprising and the catastrophic Battle of Adrianople (378), where the eastern army is largely destroyed and Valens killed—a defeat Ammianus ranks with the Battle of Cannae.

== Sources ==
The sources Ammianus used are debated. Though he rarely specifies, he likely consulted inscriptions, archives, and Julian’s lost notes on the Battle of Strasbourg.

For the lost early books, he probably drew on Cassius Dio’s Roman History (to 229 AD), confirmed by comparative studies, and Herodian’s History of the Empire (180–238 AD). Other potential sources include Dexippus’s Chronicle (to 270 AD) and Skythikà, both contemporary accounts, and possibly Eunapius, a militant pagan extending Dexippus, though this is contested.

Latin sources likely include the Enmannsche Kaisergeschichte, an imperial history known via a 4th-century breviary, possibly extending to Constantine I or 357; Aurelius Victor’s De Caesaribus; and Marius Maximus, despite Ammianus’s disparaging remarks. Biographies from Nerva to Elagabalus are also probable. The lost Annali of Virius Nicomachus Flavianus are often cited, with comparisons to Byzantine chronicler John Zonaras suggesting a shared source, termed Leoquelle (from Leo the Grammarian, early 11th century), possibly Nicomachus Flavianus’s Annali.

From Book XV, Ammianus relies heavily on personal experience and eyewitness accounts, supplemented by other sources. Bruno Bleckmann challenges this, arguing primary sources played a lesser role than assumed, echoing Walter Klein’s earlier study. Bleckmann posits that later books (e.g., Valentinian and Valens’s biographies) leaned on literary and ecclesiastical sources, a view supported by Hans Christof Brennecke’s suggestion of Christian sources, including an Arian church history.

== Digressions ==
Ammianus’s work is valuable not only for its account of barbarian invasions but also for its historiographical richness, particularly in the Greek tradition, due to frequent digressions interrupting the imperial biographies’ formal structure. He covers geography (not always accurately), ethnography, natural history, and military matters. As one of few ancient historians with military experience, his digressions follow a consistent pattern: introduction, exposition, and conclusion, sometimes nesting further digressions, such as the one on the Parthians including "The Magi".

Unlike most ancient historians except Herodotus, these digressions explore diverse topics: the Persian Sasanians, Germans, Celts of Gaul, and Huns. Ammianus’s view of barbarians (excluding Persians) is stereotypical, reflecting both traditional historiography and modern reassessments. His scientific history sections, drawing heavily on renowned Greek works (sometimes via summaries) and Latin authors like Sallust and Julius Caesar, enhance the work’s appeal and value. Though specific sources are hard to pinpoint, he names Timagenes of Alexandria, whose work influenced other ancient writers.

These digressions also serve as "interludes" to orient readers before new sections. For instance, the digression on siege engines prepares readers for Julian’s Persian campaigns. In his Rome digression, he depicts 4th-century life and moral decline while admiring the city’s past glory. His detailed yet subjective portrait leaves the causes of this decline unclear. He omits Constantinople.

He also describes provinces like Egypt, justice, public administration, and Rome’s Egyptian obelisks. A detailed account of the 365 Mediterranean tsunami describes the earthquake, receding waters, and sudden massive waves. Gavin Kelly interprets this as a metaphor for the empire’s state post-Julian, leaderless amid barbarian waves, foreshadowing Adrianople’s fall. The final six books feature few digressions, though Ammianus adds occasional notes on the Huns or Thracians.

== Historiographical method and writing style ==
The names of all... are not expressed, and many similar things contrary to the principles of history, which is accustomed to expound the most significant events, not to investigate the minutiae of trivial causes...

— Ammianus XXVI, 1, 1, Cunctorum nomina... non sunt expressa, et similia plurima praeceptis historiae dissonantia, discurrere per negotiorum celsitudines adsuetae, non humilium minutias indagare causarum...

Ammianus believes history should selectively present events with brevitas (brevity):

Nevertheless, at the threshold of the present era, I shall briefly expound the facts worthy of memory...

— Ammianus XXVIII, 1, 2, Tamen praesentis temporis modestia fretus, carptim ut quaeque memoria digna sunt explanabo...

His work features Hellenisms and a late antique literary style, with unusual word combinations that can obscure meaning. Using established Latin literary language, he employs a rhythmic prose (cursus planus, cursus tardus, cursus velox), hinting at medieval literary prose.

Beyond style, Ammianus writes clearly, focuses on essentials, and uses examples and anecdotes to support his judgments. Historian Roger Blockley notes the unparalleled scope of Ammianus’s examples in Latin historical literature.

He employs rhetoric to persuade readers, aligning with ancient historiography’s aim to convey truth. Virtues attributed to emperors serve a pedagogical role, as Ammianus attributes the empire’s decline to individual failings.

Unlike many ancient historians, he rarely invents speeches, a common stylistic device. The Res Gestae include only 13 speeches (4 by Constantius, 7 by Julian, 2 by Valentinian), prioritizing factual reporting over dramatic effect.

Ammianus frequently alludes to other authors, showcasing his broad knowledge of history and law. His erudition—familiarity with Plato, Cicero, Livy, Sallust, and Tacitus’s major works—and diverse sources enrich his descriptions.

== Transmission and rediscovery ==
During Ammianus’s lifetime, his work was highly regarded but later fell into obscurity, partly due to its sophisticated style. Early 5th-century historian Sulpicius Alexander may have used it. The Historia Augusta author drew on it, renaming Ammianus "Fabius Marcellinus" or "Valerius Marcellinus," with stylistic similarities like the rare word carrago in the final book. By the 6th century, only Priscian of Caesarea cites Book XIV, suggesting the first thirteen books were already lost.

The work survives in sixteen medieval manuscripts: two from the 9th century, the rest from the 15th century. Only eleven are complete, covering Books XIV–XXXI.

Rediscovered in the early 15th century, Poggio Bracciolini found a 9th-century copy (the Codex Fuldensis) at Fulda Abbey in 1417 during the Council of Constance. The first edition, Books XIV–XXVI, was published in Rome in 1474, based on the Codex Fuldensis, now at the Vatican Library as Vaticanus Latinus 1873. Whether the Codex Fuldensis (Books XIV–XXXI) derives from the 9th-century Codex Hersfeldensis or both stem from a common archetype is uncertain. The Codex Hersfeldensis is mostly lost, save for fragments, making the Codex Fuldensis the primary witness. A 15th-century copy exists by Niccolò Niccoli.

Editions include Books XIV–XXVI by Angelo Sabino (Rome, 1474) and Johannes Froben (Basel, 1518). Mariangelo Accursio’s 1533 Augsburg edition first included Books XXVII–XXXI. Sigismund Gelenius’s 1533 edition, based on the Codex Hersfeldensis, aids reconstruction despite transmission errors tied to Ammianus’s style. The standard 21st-century Latin edition is by Wolfgang Seyfarth, with a 2011 annotated version

== Bibliography ==
- Pontiggia, G.; Grandi, M.C. (2005). Letteratura Latina. Principato. ISBN 88-416-2193-1.
- von Albrecht, Michael (2003). Geschichte der römischen Literatur (in German). Vol. 2 and 3. Munich: TB. pp. 1127–1138.
- Barnes, Timothy David (1998). Ammianus Marcellinus and the representation of historical reality. Cornell University Press. ISBN 0-8014-3526-9. OCLC 38916887.
- Rosen, Klaus (1982). Ammianus Marcellinus (in German). Wissenschaftliche Buchgesellschaft. p. 52 and following. ISBN 3-534-06373-2. OCLC 10001803.
- Seyfarth, Wolfgang (1978). Seyfarth, Wolfgang (ed.). Ammiani Marcellini Rervm gestarvm libri qvi svpersvnt (in Latin). Vol. Bibliotheca scriptorvm Graecorvm et Romanorvm Tevbneriana. Leipzig: Weidmannos. p. 32.
