= Pompeius (consul 501) =

Byzantine politician

Pompeius (Latin: Pompeius; Greek: Πομπήιος, died 532) was a politician of the Byzantine Empire and nephew of the Emperor Anastasius I (reigned 491–518). His family gained political prominence with the accession of Anastasius. Pompeius was consul in 501, and was elevated to the patricianate, probably by Anastasius. He held military office, serving in the Iberian War. He married a woman named Anastasia, and had at least one son. In 532, Pompeius' brother Hypatius was acclaimed emperor by the rioters during the Nika riots; after the riots were put down, both Hypatius and Pompeius were executed.

== Family ==
He was a son of Secundinus and Caesaria. His mother was a sister of Anastasius I. His father served as Eparch of Constantinople (c. 492) and Roman consul in 511. Secundinus also held the rank of patrician. The main sources for the career of Secundinus are John of Antioch and Theophanes the Confessor. The latter preserved fragments of Theodorus Lector which cover Secundinus. Joannes Laurentius Lydus briefly mentions the consulship of Secundinus as a chronological reference.

John Malalas and Theophanes identify Secundinus as the father of Hypatius. Hypatius and Pompeius are identified as brothers by Procopius, therefore sharing the same parents.

Anastasius and his extended family were Illyrians of obscure origins. When Anastasius rose to the throne, his family gained access to high-ranking military and political positions. His brother Paulus, his brother-in-law Secundinus and nephews Hypatius, Pompeius and Probus all became consuls, with Hypatius at least becoming a magister militum. Irene, a daughter of Paulus, married Anicius Olybrius. Her husband was a son of Anicia Juliana and through her a descendant of the Theodosian dynasty. The marriage was likely arranged to further secure Anastasius on his throne. Other women of the family married Sabinianus and Moschianus who also became consuls. Consuls Anastasius, Moschianus and Anastasius were among the youngest members of this family and their names reflect those of several older relatives.

== Life ==
The Chronicon Paschale mentions Pompeius as Roman consul in 501, serving alongside Avienus. He is also known to have served as a military commander to the troops of the Diocese of Thrace during the reign of his uncle. His military career is considered part of a pattern of family patronage employed by most Emperors and Empresses of the period. The families promoted in this way could then remain influential long after the deaths of their imperial relatives.

Marcellinus Comes reports that Pompeius' house at Constantinople was burnt down during the anti-Monophysite riots of 512. Considering Pompeius himself was a Chalcedonian, he was probably not specifically targeted. His religious affiliation was recorded by Cyril of Scythopolis and Theophanes. He was known to have been acquainted with Sabbas the Sanctified in 511–512. He also provided assistance to the deposed Patriarch Macedonius II of Constantinople during the latter's exile.

Romana by Jordanes records that Pompeius and his troops suffered defeat at a battle near Adrianople, facing foreign invaders. While the event can be dated to c. 517, the context is unclear. The invaders are not identified, though this could be part of the ongoing invasion of the Antae. This invasion is known to have taken place at approximately the same time.

He supported negotiation with Pope Hormisdas over the Acacian schism. In 519, Pompeius, Vitalian and Justinian (the future emperor) met the papal envoys at some distance from Constantinople and escorted them for the rest of the way. He also maintained correspondence with Hormisdas during that year.

While Cyril of Scythopolis, John Malalas and the Chronicon Paschale all agree that Pompeius held the rank of patrician during the late 520s, it is unknown when he gained the title. It is considered likely that this would be another act of favor from Anastasius, rather than Justin I or Justinian I. In any case, Malalas reports that patrician Pompeius was involved in the Iberian War. In 528, Pompeius led reinforcements consisting of Illyrians, Scythians, Thracians and Isaurians towards the Persian front. They presumably arrived late in the campaign season, because the text goes on to say that hostilities ceased for the winter. His military rank at the time is uncertain. Hypatius was the magister militum per Orientem, so Pompeius could have held the ranks of magister militum praesentales or magister militum vacans.

Pompeius figures prominently in Procopius' account of the Nika riots (532). Procopios writes of how Pompeius and his brother Hypatius were thrown out of the Imperial palace by an increasingly paranoid Justinian, who suspected that they may be plotting against him. The brothers profess their loyalty to the emperor, and fear that them being cast out would lead to the mob forcing them to vie for the throne, but Justinian insists on their departure. This account by Procopios is largely accepted by historians to at least be based in some semblance of reality, with Alan Cameron writing that when Justinian ordered the brothers to leave, “they warned him that the people might forcibly proclaim them, at which he grew even more suspicious and, unwisely, sent them away immediately.”

The extent to which this action by Justinian stemmed from genuine suspicion of Pompeius and Hypatius is debated by historians. Geoffery Greatrex puts forward the argument that this was a tactical move by Justinian, after his attempts to appeal to the crowd had failed. Greatrex writes that should either of the brothers be chosen by the people to become their new emperor, they would be faced with an impossible decision of either refusing, and being killed by the rioters, or accepting and becoming disloyal to Justinian, which would surely result in its own dire consequences. He argues that the decision by Justinian to force them to leave the palace can therefore be interpreted as a tactical choice to gather the rioters in the Hippodrome when they ‘crown’ their new emperor, making them easier to suppress.

Regardless of whether the decision to cast out Pompeius and Hypatius was an act of paranoia or tactical intention, it resulted in the rioters proclaiming Hypatius the new emperor, despite the supposed protests of both him and his wife, Maria. In ‘The History of the Wars’, Procopios portrays both Hypatius and Pompeius as being wholly unwilling in the rioters’ efforts to overthrow Justinian. He writes:

Then, while Pompeius was weeping and uttering pitiable words (for the man was wholly inexperienced in such misfortunes), Hypatius reproached him at length and said that those who were about to die unjustly should not lament. For in the beginning they had been forced by the people against their will, and afterwards they had come to the hippodrome with no thought of harming the emperor.

This account is corroborated by historians, as John Bagnell Bury noted "that The Emperor, suspicious though he was, probably believed that they were not morally guilty, but feared that they would be used as tools in future conspiracies. They were too dangerous to be allowed to live, but their children were spared."

The Riots resulted in the executions of both Hypatius and Pompeius, with their bodies being thrown into the sea, and their property being taken by the state and given to the treasury. The execution is confirmed by Marcellinus Comes, Zacharias Rhetor, Evagrius Scholasticus, John Malalas, the Chronicon Paschale, Victor of Tunnuna, Theophanes the Confessor, and Joannes Zonaras. While Hypatius' body was said to have washed up on the shore, Pompeius' body was never found.

However, both Pompeius and Hypatius had their names posthumously restored by Justinian, with the confiscated property being given back to their sons, though it is unclear how long after the Nika Riots this forgiveness would have taken place.

== Marriage and children ==
Pompeius was married to Anastasia. She was already known as a fervent Chalcedonian Christian and philanthropist by the time of his death. She had personally met Sabbas the Sanctified in 511/2 and maintained correspondence with Pope Hormisdas, the latter mainly concerning the Acacian schism. She later founded a monastery located on the Mount of Olives and retired there as its abbess. Anastasia was one of the sources used by Cyril of Scythopolis. While named Anastasia and a patricia by rank, she should be distinguished from her contemporary Anastasia the Patrician.

Pompeius and Anastasia had at least one son, whose name is not known. Modern genealogical theories have suggested that the couple could be parents or ancestors to later Byzantine figures such as John Mystacon, Nicetas and Epiphania, the mother of Heraclius, but this remains unconfirmed.

== Sources ==
- Bury, John Bagnell (1958) [1923], History of the Later Roman Empire: From the Death of Theodosius I to the Death of Justinian, Volume 2, Mineola, New York: Dover Publications, OCLC 41478187
- Cameron, Alan. (1978). The House of Anastasius. Greek, Roman and Byzantine Studies 19, (3): 259 -276 - Via ProQuest.
- Cameron, Averil; Ward-Perkins, Bryan; Whitby, Michael (2000), The Cambridge Ancient History, Vol. XIV: 425-600, Cambridge University Press, ISBN 0-521-32591-9
- Croke, Brian (2001), Count Marcellinus and his chronicle, Oxford University Press, ISBN 0-19-815001-6
- Dindorf, Ludwig August (1832), Corpus scriptorum historiae byzantinae: Chronicon paschale, vol. 1, E. Weber
- Greatrex, Geoffrey. (1997) “The Nika Riot: A Reappraisal.” The Journal of Hellenic Studies 117: 60–86. https://doi.org/10.2307/632550.
- Martindale, John R., ed. (1980). The Prosopography of the Later Roman Empire: Volume II, AD 395–527. Cambridge: Cambridge University Press. ISBN 0-521-20159-4.
- Patrich, Joseph (1995), Sabas, leader of Palestinian monasticism: a comparative study in Eastern monasticism, fourth to seventh centuries, Dumbarton Oaks, ISBN 0-88402-221-8
- Procopius of Caesarea; Dewing, Henry Bronson (1914), History of the wars. vol. 1, Books I-II, Cambridge University Press, ISBN 0-674-99054-4

Political offices
Preceded by Fl. Patricius, Fl. Hypatius	Consul of the Roman Empire; 501 with Fl. Avienus	Succeeded by Rufius Magnus Faustus Avienus iunior, Fl. Probus
