= Hypatius (consul 500) =

Roman consul

Hypatius (Greek: Ὑπάτιος; died 532) was a Byzantine noble of imperial descent who held the position of commander in the East during the reign of Justin I, and was chosen by the mob as emperor during the Nika riots in Constantinople against Justinian I and executed shortly thereafter.

== Life ==
Hypatius was the nephew of Emperor Anastasius I, who ruled before Justin. He was also associated by marriage to the noble Anicii gens, which gave him a serious claim to the imperial diadem; however, Hypatius showed no such ambition. He and the other nephews of Anastasius were well-treated by both Justin I and his successor to the Byzantine throne, Justinian I.

In the height of the Nika riots, Hypatius, along with his brother Pompeius and cousin Probus (another nephew of Anastasius), were among the prime candidates for the imperial throne. As it became clear that the mob wanted a new emperor, Probus fled the city and Hypatius and Pompeius took shelter in the Imperial Palace, along with Justinian and the rest of the Byzantine Senate. This situation has been interpreted in different ways: the common opinion is that they did not wish to rebel against Justinian, fearing they would have too little popular support. Some historians have argued that Hypatius did want the throne, after possibly being falsely told of Justinian and Theodoras' running away.

Nevertheless, Justinian, fearing treachery, expelled the Senate from the Palace, thus ushering the two brothers into the mob's arms. Hypatius was dragged away from his house, despite the efforts and advice of his wife, Mary (Maria), to prevent this.

Hypatius was acclaimed by the mob at the Constantine forum before being paraded to the Hippodrome, where the mob proclaimed him emperor. He was seated within the kathisma, where the emperor would usually sit. Hypatius seems to have thereafter overcome his initial reluctance, and began to play up to the part of emperor, though it is unknown whether this was due to genuine support for the attempted usurpation or simply to appease the mob.

However, the riots were soon successfully (if bloodily) quelled by the Imperial Guard, and Hypatius was captured by Justinian's men. Justinian is reported to have wanted to spare Hypatius's life, but his wife Theodora prevailed upon him to see the punishment meted out, and the involuntary usurper was executed along with his brother, and their bodies thrown into the sea.

According to Procopius, Hypatius's properties were also promptly seized by the Imperial Treasury although some of these were later restored to Hypatius's children.

Julianus, the Praetorian Prefect of the East (530/531), supported Hypatius, and wrote two epigrams about him after his death, which were later included in the Greek Anthology (7.591 and 7.592).

== See also ==
- Anastasian War and Vitalian for his campaigns

== Bibliography ==
- Bury, J. B. (1958). History of the later Roman Empire. Vol. 2 (Reprint ed.). New York. ISBN 9780486203997.
- Browning, Robert (1971). Justinian and Theodora. Milano. ISBN 9780297001003.
- Moorhead, John (1994). Justinian. New York. ISBN 0-582-06304-3.

Preceded by Fl. Iohannes Gibbus	Consul of the Roman Empire; 500 with Fl. Patricius	Succeeded by Fl. Avienus Iunior, Fl. Pompeius
