= Avienus (consul 501) =

Roman politician

Flavius Avienus (fl. 501–509) was a Roman politician during the reign of Theodoric the Great. He held the consulship with Pompeius as colleague in 501.

He probably belonged to the gens Decia; he was the son of Caecina Decius Maximus Basilius (consul in 480), and brother of Albinus (consul in 493), Theodorus (consul in 505) and Inportunus (consul in 509). John Moorhead argues that the brothers were on different sides of the Laurentian schism, with Albinus and Avienus supporting Symmachus and Theodore and Inportunus supporting Laurentius.

He was a correspondent of Magnus Felix Ennodius; one letter by Ennodius to Avienus has been preserved.

By 507/509, Avienus and his brother Albinus had already become patricii; around this time, but after the death of their father, they were asked to become patrons of the Greens and to appoint a pantomime.

== Notes ==
Political offices
| Preceded by Patricius; Hypatius | Roman consul 501 with Pompeius | Succeeded by Rufius Magnus Faustus Avienus; Probus |
