= Pan Yunu =

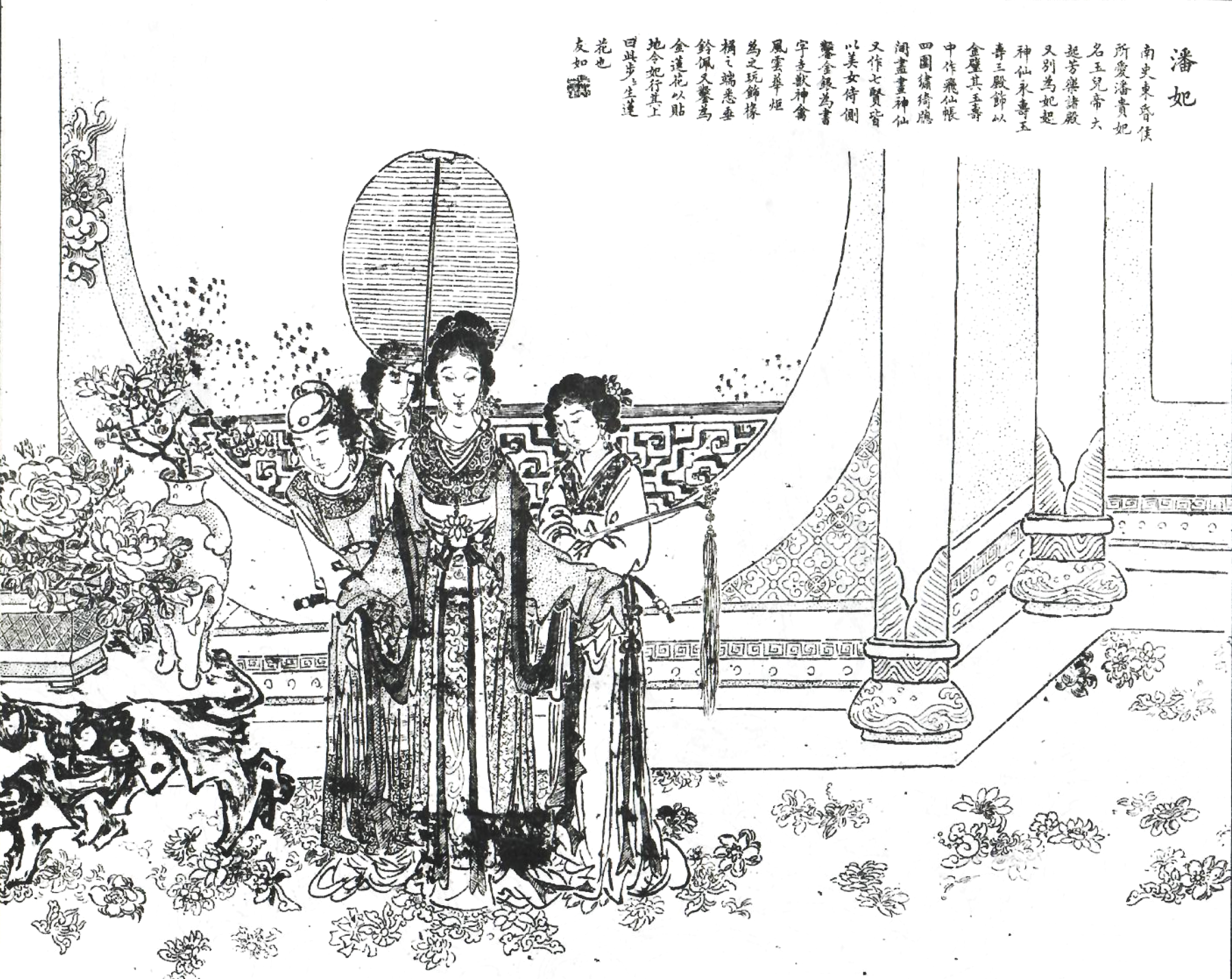
19th century drawing of Lady Pan (潘貴妃)

Pan Yunu (Chinese: 潘玉奴; died c.January 502), Pan Yu'er (Chinese: 潘玉兒), or Yu Nizi (Chinese: 俞妮子), was an imperial consort of the Chinese Southern Qi dynasty. She was a concubine of Xiao Baojuan. During his reign, she carried the title Guifei (貴妃) -- a rank that was higher than the usual ranks for imperial concubines, and she was therefore also often referred to as Pan Guifei or Pan Fei (Chinese: 潘妃).

Consort Pan was described to be exceedingly beautiful, and Xiao Baojuan much favored her. She was once a courtesan in Wang Jingze's family. She was described to be so elegant in her walking that Xiao Baojuan made tiles of lotus patterns with gold and her walk on it, praising her walk as "each step there is a lotus." Her father Pan Baoqing (潘寶慶), a commoner, was referred to by Xiao Baojuan as Azhang (阿丈), roughly translatable as "honored uncle," and he often took his attendants to Pan Baoqing's house, assisting him in many household chores. Pan Baoqing took this opportunity to be corrupt, and he often falsely accused rich families of crimes, in order to have them executed and their properties seized and given to him, often killing the families' entire male lines.

Xiao Baojuan was a violent ruler who executed officials whimsically, and this eventually drew a number of rebellions, the last of which, by the general Xiao Yan, overthrew him, as he was assassinated within the capital Jiankang in December 501 as Xiao Yan sieged it. Once Xiao Yan entered the capital, he had Xiao Baojuan posthumously demoted to the title of Marquess of Donghun. Initially, he wanted to take Consort Pan as his own concubine, but his general Wang Mao (王茂) advised against it, arguing that she should be considered responsible for Xiao Baojuan's destruction. Xiao Yan therefore ordered her executed by strangulation.

Some believe that Pan Yunu started the Chinese tradition of foot binding, but there is no evidence that she had ever bound her feet. Her story appears to be inspiration for the character of Pan Jinlian, a key character in the novels Water Margin and Jin Ping Mei.
