= Euphemia (empress) =

- Augusta
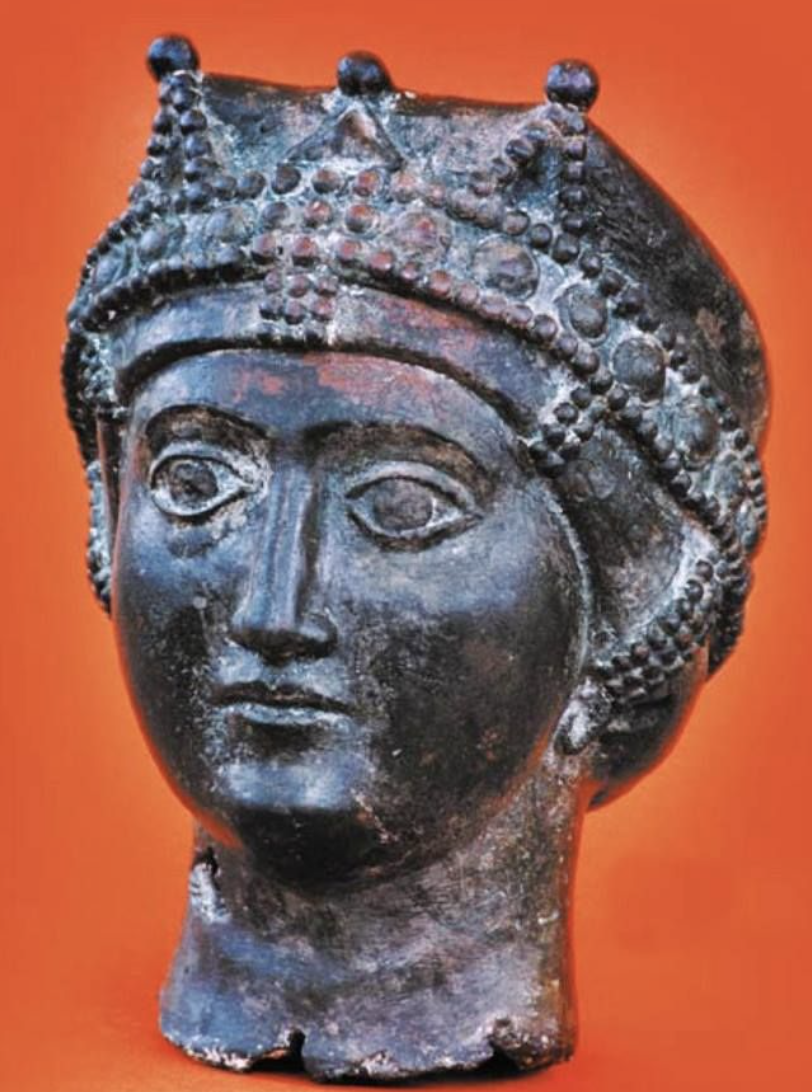
- Possible portrait of Euphemia, National Museum of Serbia.

Eastern Roman empress
- Tenure: 10 July 518 – 524?
- Born: 5th century
- Died: 523/524; Constantinople (modern-day Istanbul, Turkey)
- Burial: Church of Saint Euphemia
- Spouse: Justin I
- Dynasty: Justinian Dynasty

Euphemia (Greek: Εὐφημία, died 523 or 524), born Lupicina, was an Empress of the Eastern Roman Empire by marriage to Justin I.

Empress Euphemia is credited with the ecclesiastical policies of Justin and she founded a Church of Saint Euphemia, where she was buried following her death, probably in either 523 or 524. Justin was buried by her side in 527.

== Early life ==
Her original name was Lupicina, according to Procopius and Victor of Tunnuna. According to the Secret History of Procopius, Lupicina was both a slave and a barbarian. He asserted that she had been the concubine of her owner.

Justin I was a Thracian or Illyrian peasant from the Latinophone region of Dardania, which is part of the province of Illyricum. He was born in a hamlet near Bederiana in Naissus (modern Niš, South Serbia). As a young man, he left for Constantinople to escape poverty, and rose in the ranks of the army of the Eastern Roman Empire. At some point in his life, he met Lupicina, freed her and married her.

== Succession of Justin I ==
By 518, Justin had risen to the position of comes excubitorum ("Commander of the Excubitors", the imperial bodyguard). On the night hours of 8 July 518 – 9 July 518, Anastasius died and his silentarii summoned Justin and Celer to his deathbed. Celer was the magister officiorum and commander of the palace regiments of the Scholae palatinae. By morning the event had been announced through Constantinople. The high officials, including the recently appointed John of Cappadocia, Patriarch of Constantinople, were summoned to the Great Palace of Constantinople for the election of the new emperor. Meanwhile, the people were gathered in the Hippodrome of Constantinople and awaited the proclamation of a new emperor.

Anastasius died childless, but had several known relatives. His brother Paulus had served as Roman consul in 496. A sister-in-law, known as Magna, was mother to Irene and mother-in-law to Olybrius. This Olybrius was the son of Anicia Juliana and Areobindus. The daughter of Olybrius and Irene was named Proba. She married Probus and was mother to a younger Juliana. This younger Juliana married another Anastasius and was mother of Areobindus, Placidia, and a younger Proba. Another nephew of Anastasius was Flavius Probus, consul in 502. Caesaria, sister of Anastasius, married Secundinus. They were parents to Hypatius and Pompeius. Anastasius Paulus Probus Moschianus Probus Magnus, Roman consul in 518 also was a great-nephew of Anastasius. His daughter Juliana later married Marcellus, a brother of Justin II. The extensive family may well have included viable candidates for the throne.

Nonetheless, Justin was elected as the new emperor by the council. According to John Malalas, the praepositus sacri cubiculi, Amantius, had intended to elect a comes domesticorum, commander of an elite guard unit of the late Roman Empire, by the name of Theocritus to the throne. His election is described as the result of a combination of commanding the only effective troops within the capital and buying the support of the other officials. Supposedly Amantius had given a substantial sum of money to Justin in order to buy his support, however, Justin used the sum to buy support for himself. Both Amantius and Theocritus were executed nine days after the election. On 1 August 518, Justin sent a letter to Pope Hormisdas where he claimed he was an unwilling participant in his own election.

As Justin I, he was proclaimed emperor in the Hippodrome in accordance with tradition. Lupicina became his empress consort under the name Euphemia. The name was probably chosen for reasons of respectability. The original Euphemia was a Christian martyr during the Diocletianic Persecution. She was a local saint of Chalcedon and the Council of Chalcedon (451) had taken place in a cathedral consecrated in her name. An alleged miracle in her grave had supposedly confirmed the decisions taken. The selection of this name is suspected to be an early indication of both Justin and Lupicina being fervent Chalcedonian Christians. Anastasius had supported Monophysitism and his succession marked a change in religious policies.

== Change in Name ==
In Justin, the First: An Introduction to the Epoch of Justinian the Great (1950), Alexander Vasiliev theorised that the original name of his wife may indicate a linguistic association in another language, with prostitution. Vasiliev connected the name to the Latin word "Lupae" (she-wolves). While the word in its singular Latin form "Lupa" could literally mean a female wolf, it also was the epithet or disparaging slur for the lowest class of Roman prostitutes. The derivative Latin word "Lupanar" was the name of a brothel in Pompeii. Many of these denigrating uses may have origins in derisive comments about the priestesses of a cult of the Etruscan religion that predated the Roman, in which the deity was represented as a she-wolf (similar to Artemis in Greek Mythology), which would imply a quite different derivation and make greater sense of the choice of Euphemia, hence a euphemism, as an alternative name for the empress. The wolf, Lupa, who nursed Romulus and Remus is related to the cult of this wolf-goddess and the matrilineal, Etruscan civilization that preceded the Roman. Acca Larentia is another name for the wolf or the deity represented.

Emulation of the cultural hero, the religious martyr Saint Euphemia, may have had a more contemporary association and reason for selection as the royal name for the empress, especially given the religious changes taking place in Constantinople at the time and the apparent interest of the empress in the veneration of the saint.

== Empress Euphemia ==
Although Procopius states in his Secret History that Euphemia was unacquainted with affairs of state and thus unable to take part in government, an official church source which dates to 540, the Chronicle of Edessa, attributes the ecclesiastical policies of Justin to Empress Euphemia.

Procopius also claims that both members of the imperial couple attained the throne in the closing years of their lives. Being childless, their heir was Justinian I. He was the nephew and adoptive son of Justin.

Procopius states that Euphemia opposed the marriage of her nephew to Theodora as she was opposed to the supposed vice of her prospective niece-in-law. Procopius clarifies that only following her death was Justinian able to arrange his betrothal and marriage to Theodora. The widowed Justin proceeded to pass a law allowing intermarriage between social classes, presumably for the sake of his heir. Vasiliev estimated the death of Euphemia to have occurred in 523 or 524.

Royal titles
Preceded by Ariadne	Roman Empress consort 518–c. 524	Succeeded by Theodora
