= 524 =

Calendar year

524 in various calendars
Gregorian calendar	524; DXXIV
Ab urbe condita	1277
Assyrian calendar	5274
Balinese saka calendar	445–446
Bengali calendar	−70 – −69
Berber calendar	1474
Buddhist calendar	1068
Burmese calendar	−114
Byzantine calendar	6032–6033
Chinese calendar	癸卯年 (Water Rabbit); 3221 or 3014 — to — 甲辰年 (Wood Dragon); 3222 or 3015
Coptic calendar	240–241
Discordian calendar	1690
Ethiopian calendar	516–517
Hebrew calendar	4284–4285
- Hindu calendars
Vikram Samvat	580–581
Shaka Samvat	445–446
Kali Yuga	3624–3625
Holocene calendar	10524
Iranian calendar	98 BP – 97 BP
Islamic calendar	101 BH – 100 BH
Javanese calendar	411–412
Julian calendar	524; DXXIV
Korean calendar	2857
Minguo calendar	1388 before ROC 民前1388年
Nanakshahi calendar	−944
Seleucid era	835/836 AG
Thai solar calendar	1066–1067
Tibetan calendar	ཆུ་མོ་ཡོས་ལོ་ (female Water-Hare); 650 or 269 or −503 — to — ཤིང་ཕོ་འབྲུག་ལོ་ (male Wood-Dragon); 651 or 270 or −502

Year 524 (DXXIV) was a leap year starting on Monday on the Julian calendar. In the Roman Empire, it was known as the Year of the Consulship of Iustinus and Opilio (or, less frequently, year 1277 Ab urbe condita). The denomination 524 for this year has been used since the early medieval period, when the Anno Domini calendar era became the prevalent method in Europe for naming years.

== Events ==
=== By place ===
==== Europe ====
- January 1 – Venantius Opilio is appointed by Byzantium's Emperor Justin to administer the Western Roman Empire as the Roman consul, replacing Anicius Maximus. The Emperor Justin appoints himself as consul for the West, an office vacant since 522, but has Theodorus Filoxenus administering the west.
- May 1 – King Sigismund of Burgundy is executed at Orléans after an 8-year reign, and is succeeded by his brother Godomar. He rallies the Burgundian army and begins plundering Frankish territory.
- June 25 – Battle of Vézeronce: The Franks under Chlodomer, Childebert I and Chlothar I are defeated by the Burgundians and allied Ostrogoths near Isère (France), averting the Frankish advance into Burgundy. During the fighting Chlodomer is killed. Later Childebert annexes the cities of Chartres and Orléans.
- October 23 – Anicius Manlius Boethius, one of Rome's most prolific writers and philosophers, is beaten to death at the prison at Pavia, where he has been imprisoned for treason. During his prison sentence, he has written his final work, The Consolation of Philosophy. The date of the death of St. Boethius is later celebrated as his feast day on the Roman Catholic Calendar of Saints.
- Date unknown – Queen Guntheuc, widow of Chlodomer, is forced into marrying his brother, Chlothar I. Her two children are murdered by him, but the eldest son Clodoald survives by escaping to Provence.

==== Central America ====
- November 29 – Ahkal Moʼ Nahb I, ruler of the Maya city of Palenque in what is now the southern Mexican state of Chiapas, dies after a reign of 23 years. The city enters an interregnum which lasts a little over four years.

== Births ==
- September 18 – Kan Bahlam I, ruler of Palenque (d. 583)
- He Shikai, high official of Northern Qi (d. 571)
- Xiao Daqi, crown prince of Northern Qi (d. 551)
- Xiao Jing Di, emperor of Eastern Wei (d. 552)

== Deaths ==
- June 25 – Chlodomer, king of the Franks
- July 12 – Viventiolus, Archbishop of Lyon (b. 460)
- November 29 – Ahkal Moʼ Nahb I, ruler of Palenque (Mexico) (b. 465)
- Boethius, Roman philosopher and writer (b. 480)
- Brigit of Kildare, Irish patron saint
- Sanghapala, Mon-Khmer monk (b. 460)
- Sigismund, king of the Burgundians
- Zhou She, high official of Southern Liang (b. 469)
