= Rufius Gennadius Probus Orestes =

Roman senator

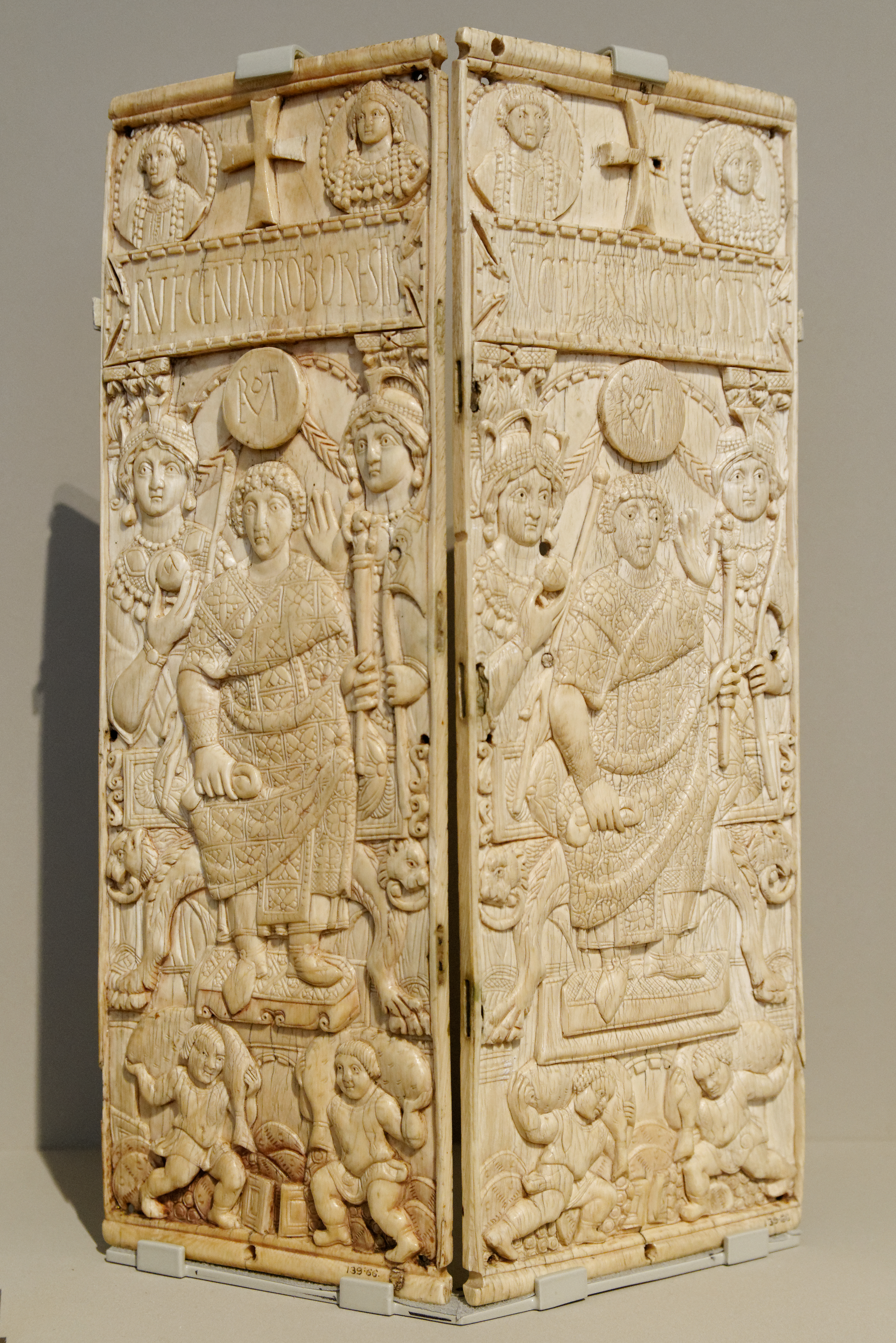
Consular diptych of Rufius Gennadius Probus Orestes, Victoria and Albert museum

Rufius Gennadius Probus Orestes (died 552) was a Roman aristocrat. He was appointed consul of the Senate for the year 530, which he held alongside Flavius Lampadius. Johannes Sundwall believed Orestes was the son of Rufius Magnus Faustus Avienus, the consul of 502, and this view has been supported by more recent writers.

On 17 December 546 Orestes was in Rome when the Ostrogothic King Totila captured the city. Orestes, Anicius Olybrius (who had been consul in 526), Anicius Maximus (who had been consul in 523), and other patricii sought refuge in Old St. Peter's Basilica. He afterwards joined a group of refugees who followed the Byzantine army as far as Portus. The following year, when some Byzantine soldiers were patrolling in Campania and encountered captured senators, who were freed and afterward sent to Sicily, he was left behind due to a lack of horses. Orestes was still a prisoner of the Ostrogoths when Narses conquered Rome in 552; the senators were preparing to return to Rome, but, enraged by the death of Totila, the Goths who guarded them killed them all.

== Notes ==
Political offices
Preceded by Decius	Consul of the Roman Empire; 530 with Flavius Lampadius	Vacant Title next held by Justinian I
