= 522 =

Calendar year

522 in various calendars
Gregorian calendar	522; DXXII
Ab urbe condita	1275
Assyrian calendar	5272
Balinese saka calendar	443–444
Bengali calendar	−72 – −71
Berber calendar	1472
Buddhist calendar	1066
Burmese calendar	−116
Byzantine calendar	6030–6031
Chinese calendar	辛丑年 (Metal Ox); 3219 or 3012 — to — 壬寅年 (Water Tiger); 3220 or 3013
Coptic calendar	238–239
Discordian calendar	1688
Ethiopian calendar	514–515
Hebrew calendar	4282–4283
- Hindu calendars
Vikram Samvat	578–579
Shaka Samvat	443–444
Kali Yuga	3622–3623
Holocene calendar	10522
Iranian calendar	100 BP – 99 BP
Islamic calendar	103 BH – 102 BH
Javanese calendar	409–410
Julian calendar	522; DXXII
Korean calendar	2855
Minguo calendar	1390 before ROC 民前1390年
Nanakshahi calendar	−946
Seleucid era	833/834 AG
Thai solar calendar	1064–1065
Tibetan calendar	ལྕགས་མོ་གླང་ལོ་ (female Iron-Ox); 648 or 267 or −505 — to — ཆུ་ཕོ་སྟག་ལོ་ (male Water-Tiger); 649 or 268 or −504

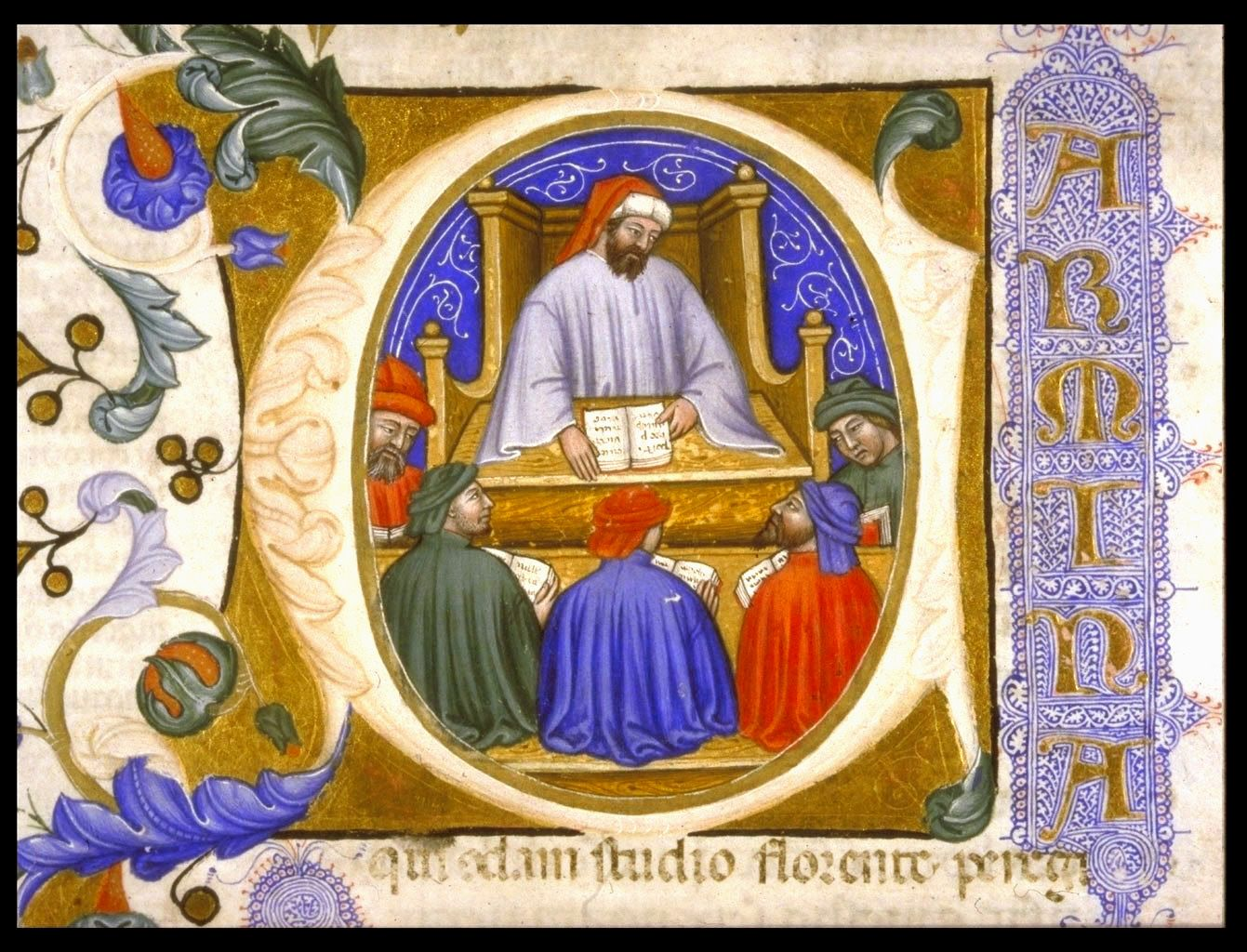
Boethius teaching his students (initial of 1385)

Year 522 (DXXII) was a common year starting on Saturday of the Julian calendar. At the time, it was known as the Year of the Consulship of Symmachus and Boethius (or, less frequently, year 1275 Ab urbe condita). The denomination 522 for this year has been used since the early medieval period, when the Anno Domini calendar era became the prevalent method in Europe for naming years.

== Events ==
=== By place ===
==== Europe ====
- Anicius Manlius Severinus Boethius, Roman philosopher, is arrested on charges of having conspired against Theodoric the Great. He is imprisoned at Pavia (Lombardy).
- Amalaric, age 20, is proclaimed king of the Visigoths. His kingdom is threatened from the north by the Burgundians.

==== Arabia ====
- Dhu Nuwas seizes the throne of the Himyarite Kingdom in Yemen. He attacks the Aksumite garrison at Zafar, capturing the city and burning the churches.
- Dhū Nuwas moves to Najran, an Aksumite stronghold. After accepting the city's capitulation, he massacres the Christian inhabitants (some sources estimate a death toll up to 20,000).

== Births ==
- 15 October – Colmán of Cloyne, Irish monk (d. 600)
- Clodoald, Merovingian prince (approximate date)
- Wen Di, emperor of the Chen dynasty (d. 566)

== Deaths ==
- Eutharic, son-in-law of Theodoric the Great
- Galan Erilich, king of the Picts (approximate date)
- Liu Xie, Chinese writer (approximate date) (b. 465)
