= Urbitius =

Urbitius or Urbicius may refer to:

- Urbicius (eunuch) (Οὐρβίκιος), a powerful Byzantine court official of the 5th century
- Urbitius (French Urbice), the first known bishop of Clermont-Ferrand, in the 2nd century
- Urbitius (French Urbice), a Bishop of Metz of the fifth century
- Saint Urbicius (French Urbice, d. 805)
