= Amantius (praepositus) =

Amantius (Greek: Ἀμάντιος, romanized: Amantios) was the head chamberlain (praepositus sacri cubiculi) of the Byzantine emperor Anastasius I. Defeated by Justin I in the intrigues and power struggles after Anastasius' death, he was executed.

A eunuch, he was appointed to the post of praepositus sacri cubiculi sometime after 513, as he was an addressee of the Miaphysite prelate Severus of Antioch; Amantius himself was probably a Miaphysite. According to Evagrius, he was among the most influential members of Anastasius' court. Towards the end of Anastasius' life, the emperor and Amantius both had similar dreams on who would succeed on the throne, which were interpreted by the soothsayer Proclus Oneirocrites. He erected a church dedicated to Saint Thomas at Constantinople, in an area which later was named ta Amantou after him.

When Anastasius died on 9 July 518, Amantius, who as a eunuch was unable to claim the throne himself, instead sponsored the candidacy of Theocritus. To this end, he gave money to the comes excubitorum Justin to bribe him, but the latter used the money to acquire support for his own candidacy. After Justin was acclaimed emperor on 10 July, Amantius caused disturbances by the populace, and plotted with his fellow non-Chalcedonian cubicularius Andreas to replace Justin with Theocritus. Hated among the pro-Chalcedonian populace, he was denounced as another Chrysaphius in the Hagia Sophia on 16 July. Their plot revealed, Amantius and Andreas were executed on 20 July. Andreas and Amantius were later considered martyrs in the Oriental Orthodox Churches.

== Sources ==
- Martindale, John R., ed. (1980). The Prosopography of the Later Roman Empire: Volume II, AD 395–527. Cambridge: Cambridge University Press. ISBN 0-521-20159-4.
