= Cethegus =

Cethegus may refer to:

- Cethegus (spider), a spider genus
- Cornelii Cethegi, an ancient Roman family
- Rufius Petronius Nicomachus Cethegus, Roman senator
