= Olybrius (consul 526) =

Consul and Senator

Flavius Anicius Olybrius was a Roman politician. He was appointed to the post of consul for the year 526, which he held without a colleague.

== Biography ==
Olybrius, most certainly a westerner, was a member of the prestigious Anicius family. Following his tenure as consul, which was recognised both in the East and in the West, he held the rank of patricius. He was in Rome when the Ostrogothic king Totila captured the city. Olybrius, Anicius Maximus (who had been consul in 523), Rufius Gennadius Probus Orestes (who had been consul in 530) and other patricii sought refuge in Old St. Peter's Basilica. Captured and sent to Campania, he was still there when Narses conquered Rome in 552; the senators were preparing to return to Rome, but the Goths who guarded them, enraged by the death of Totila, killed them all.

== Notes ==
Political offices
Preceded by Probus Iunior, Theodorus Filoxenus Sotericus Filoxenus	Consul of the Roman Empire; 526	Succeeded by Vettius Agorius Basilius Mavortius (West only)
