= Decia =

Decia may refer to:

- Decia gens, an ancient Roman family
- the Ancient city and bishopric Mopsuestia
- in Latin, feminine form of decius (the) 'tenth'
