= Venantius (consul 507) =

Venantius (floruit 507) was a Roman politician and consul for the year 507 with Emperor Anastasius I as his colleague.

Venantius was the son of Petrus Marcellinus Felix Liberius. James O'Donnel notes that the "only known relative in the aristocracy" of Liberius – except for Venantius – was Avienus, consul of 501.

Political offices
Preceded by Ennodius Messala; Areobindus Dagalaifus Areobindus	Roman consul 508 with Anastasius I	Succeeded by Basilius Venantius; Celer
