= Anicius Faustus Albinus Basilius =

High official and consul of the Eastern Roman Empire

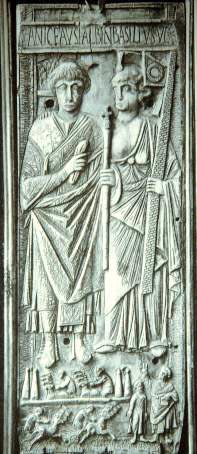
Consular diptych thought to be of Albinus Basilius

Anicius Faustus Albinus Basilius (Greek: Ανίκιος Φαύστος Αλβίνος Βασιλείος) was a high official of the Eastern Roman Empire and the last ordinary consul of Roman history, holding the office alone in 541.

== Biography ==
His origins are unknown, although his name suggests he belonged to the aristocratic Roman families of Decii and of the Anicii: it is likely that Basilius was the grandson of the consul of 480, Caecina Decius Maximus Basilius, and perhaps he was the son of the consul of 493, Caecina Decius Faustus Albinus.

When the King of the Ostrogoths Totila overcame the Byzantine defences and entered the city in December 546, Basilius, along with Rufius Petronius Nicomachus Cethegus, the president of the Senate (who had been consul in 504), and Decius (who had been consul in 529) fled Rome with general Bessas. According to the Liber Pontificalis, Basilius and Cethegus reached Constantinople where the Emperor Justinian consoled them "and enriched them as befitted Roman consuls."

On 1 January 541 he took the consulate in Constantinople without colleague. Based on the fact that Basilius entered into the consulship a few months after the Gothic surrender of Ravenna to Belisarius, it is likely his appointment by Emperor Justinian had special significance: Alan Cameron and Diane Schauer comment "Basilius' consulship symbolized the restoration of Italy and her aristocracy to the empire." It is not recorded how much longer Basilius lived after becoming consul.

A consular diptych bearing the name "Anicius Faustus Albinus Basilius" was first proposed to refer to him by Filippo Buonarroti in 1716. The consular diptych of Albinus Basilius lists his titles at the time of the consulate: vir inlustris, comes domesticorum, patricius and ordinary consul. This identification was generally accepted until 1896 when H. Graeven argued it belonged to Basilius' grandfather, Caecina Decius Maximus Basilius, the western consul of 480, based on stylistic arguments. More recently Cameron and Schauer have defended Buonarotti's identification.

| Preceded by Mar. Petrus Theodorus Valentinus; Rusticius Boraides Germanus Iustinus (alone) | Roman consul 541 | Succeeded by Justin II in 566 |
