= Decius (consul 529) =

Roman senator

Decius (Greek: Δέκιος; 529–546) was a politician of the Eastern Roman Empire. A member of the Decia gens, he was appointed consul for 529 without colleague.

== Biography ==
Decius was the son of Basilius Venantius (consul in 508), and brother of Decius Paulinus (consul in 534); according to Alan Cameron and Diane Schauer, Decius had at least one additional brother who was appointed to the consulate.

In December 546 Decius is attested as patricius in Rome. That same month, when the King of the Ostrogoths, Totila, overcame the Byzantine defences and entered the city, Decius along with Rufius Petronius Nicomachus Cethegus, the president of the Senate (who had been consul in 504), and Anicius Faustus Albinus Basilius (who had been consul in 541) fled Rome with general Bessas.

Preceded by Justinian Augustus II	Roman consul 529	Succeeded by Rufius Gennadius Probus Orestes; Lampadius
