= Olybrius (disambiguation) =

Olybrius may refer to:

- Quintus Clodius Hermogenianus Olybrius, consul in 379
- Anicius Hermogenianus Olybrius, consul in 395
- Anicius Olybrius, Western Roman emperor in 472
- Anicius Olybrius, consul in 491
- Anicius Olybrius, consul in 526
