= Basilius Venantius =

(Decius) Basilius Venantius (floruit 508–533), was a Roman aristocrat who lived during Ostrogothic rule.

== Biography ==
He was probably the son of Decius Marius Venantius Basilius, consul in 484. Venantius had several sons who became consuls, including Decius, the consul of 529, and Decius Paulinus, the consul of 534.

Venantius himself was consul in 508. Later, but before 511, he was raised to the rank of patricius. In 533 he was still alive and still held the patriciate, on the occasion King Athalaric congratulated him on the promotion of his son Decius Paulinus to the consulate, and (more importantly) the wealth to finance the celebrations that accompanied both his promotion and those of his brothers.

== Bibliography ==
- Martindale, John R., ed. (1980). "Basilius Venantius junior 5". The Prosopography of the Later Roman Empire: Volume II, AD 395–527. Cambridge: Cambridge University Press. pp. 1153–1154. ISBN 0-521-20159-4.
- Cassiodorus, Variae epistolae, IX, 23

Political offices
Preceded by Anastasius I Venantius	Roman consul 508 with Celer	Succeeded by Inportunus
