= Justin I =

Roman emperor from 518 to 527

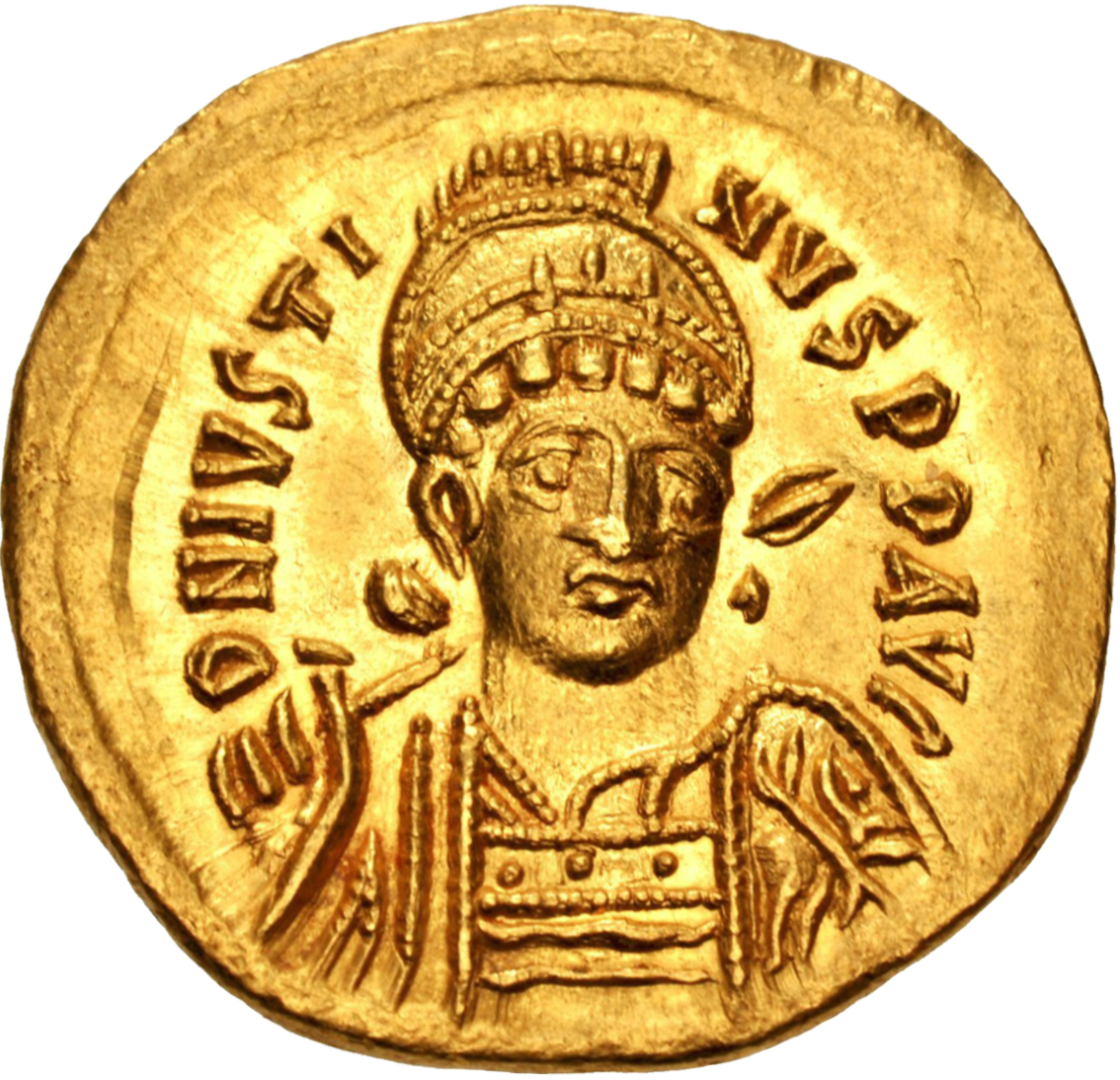
- Solidus of Justin I marked: d·n· iustinus p·p· aug·

Eastern Roman emperor
- Reign: 9 July 518 – 1 August 527
- Coronation: 10 July 518 (Note: The PLRE gives 10 July as the date of Justin's accession, following Zacharias of Mytilene. All other contemporary authors give 9 July. Constantine VII's De Ceremoniis states that he was crowned on the morning after Anastasius' death.)
- Predecessor: Anastasius I
- Successor: Justinian I
- Co-emperor: Justinian I (from 1 April 527)
- Born: c. 450; Bederiana near Naissus, Eastern Roman Empire
- Died: 1 August 527 (aged 77); Constantinople, Eastern Roman Empire
- Spouse: Euphemia
- Issue: Justinian I (adoptive)
Names
- Iustinus (Note: His name is sometimes given as Anicius Iustinus in older scholarship, but this is not corroborated by contemporary sources. The name probably derives from the fact that Germanus (cousin of Justinian I) was supposedly related to the Anicii according to the Getica, although the veracity of this statement is unknown.)
Regnal name
- Imperator Caesar Flavius Iustinus Augustus
- Dynasty: Justinian
- Religion: Chalcedonian Christianity

Justin I (Latin: Iustinus; Ancient Greek: Ἰουστῖνος, romanized: Ioustînos; c. 450 – 1 August 527), also called Justin the Thracian (Latin: Iustinus Thrax; Ancient Greek: Ἰουστῖνος ὁ Θρᾷξ, romanized: Ioustînos ho Thrâix), was Eastern Roman emperor from 518 to 527. Born to a peasant family, he rose through the ranks of the army to become commander of the imperial guard and when Emperor Anastasius I Dicorus died, he out-maneouvered his rivals and was elected as his successor, in spite of being around 68 years old. His reign is significant for the founding of the Justinian dynasty that included his nephew, Justinian I, and three succeeding emperors. His consort was Empress Euphemia.

Justin was noted for his strongly Chalcedonian Christian views. This facilitated the ending of the Acacian schism between the churches of Rome and Constantinople, resulting in good relations between Justin and the papacy. Throughout his reign, he stressed the religious nature of his office and passed edicts against various Christian groups seen at the time as non-Orthodox. In foreign affairs, he used religion as an instrument of state. He endeavoured to cultivate client states on the borders of the Empire, and avoided any significant warfare until late in his reign.

== Early career ==
Justin was born a peasant and possibly a swineherd according to legend from the hamlet Bederiana near Naissus (modern Niš, Serbia) in the province of Dardania, which was part of the Prefecture of Illyricum. He was of Thraco-Roman (Note: His companions and relatives—Zimarchus, Dityvistus, and Boraides—bore a Thracian name.) or Illyro-Roman descent, spoke Latin and only rudimentary Greek. His sister Vigilantia (born c. 455) married Sabbatius and had two children: the future emperor Petrus Sabbatius Justinianus (born 483) and Vigilantia (born c. 490). The younger Vigilantia married Dulcissimus (or Dulcidio) and had at least three children: the future emperor Justin II (born c. 520); the future general Marcellus; and Praejecta (born c. 520), who married the senator Areobindus.

As a young man, he and two companions left Dardania in order to escape the poverty of the region. Taking refuge in Constantinople, the capital of the Eastern Roman Empire, they possessed nothing more than the ragged clothes on their backs and a sack of bread among them. Illiterate at the time of his arrival there, Justin joined the newly formed palace guard, the excubitors. He served in various positions, campaigning against the Isaurians and the Sassanian Persians and was noticed for his bravery. Because of his ability he was successively appointed a tribune, a comes, a senator and, under the Emperor Anastasius I Dicorus, the influential position of comes excubitorum, commander of the palace guard. During this period he married Lupicina; no surviving children are recorded from this marriage. According to contemporary historian Procopius, Lupicina was a barbarian slave who had been a concubine of her previous owner.

== Succession ==
During the night of 8–9 July 518, Anastasius died and his silentarii, a senior servant, summoned Justin and Celer to his deathbed. Celer was the magister officiorum (master of offices) and commander of the palace regiments of the Scholae Palatinae, a force of parade-ground display troops. By morning the event had been announced throughout the capital, Constantinople. The high officials, including John of Cappadocia, the recently appointed patriarch of Constantinople, were summoned to the Great Palace for the election of a new emperor. Meanwhile, the people gathered in the Hippodrome of Constantinople and awaited the proclamation of the name of the new emperor.

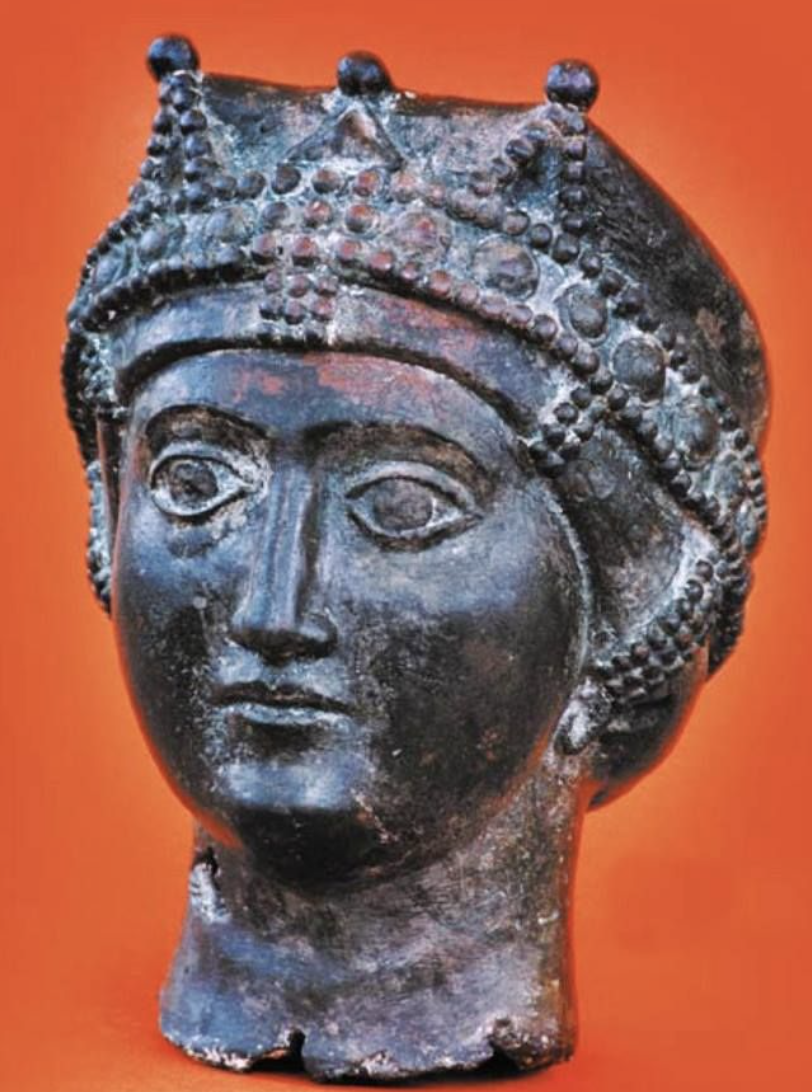
Bronze head of Euphemia in the National Museum of Serbia.

Anastasius had died childless but had a host of known relatives. This extensive family included several viable candidates for the throne. His brother Paulus had served as consul in 496. According to John Malalas, the praepositus sacri cubiculi (grand chamberlain), Amantius, had intended to have Theocritus, commander of an elite guard unit, elected to the throne. Theocritus and Amantius were relying on their control of a large military force and on buying the support of the other officials. Amantius was said to have given a substantial sum of money to Justin in order to buy his support. However, Justin controlled a smaller, but higher-quality group of soldiers, and used the money to buy support for himself. He was elected as the new emperor by the council and was proclaimed emperor in the Hippodrome.

Justin's wife became empress under the name Euphemia. The name was probably chosen for reasons of respectability. The original Euphemia was a Christian martyr during the Diocletianic Persecution. She was a local saint of Chalcedon and the Council of Chalcedon (451) had taken place in a cathedral consecrated in her name. The selection of this name was an early indication that Justin and Lupicina were fervent Chalcedonian Christians. Some of the population of the capital was supportive because of his strong Chalcedonian position on the fierce Christological debate of the time, in opposition to his predecessor's Miaphysite leanings.

== Emperor ==
Justin cemented his position by assassinating potential opponents, especially anti-Chalcedonian supporters of Anastasius. Both Amantius and Theocritus were executed nine days after the election. Early in his reign, he also dismissed a number of officials that served emperor Anastasius, including Marinus, the praetorian prefect.

In his time, Justin was viewed as an illiterate career soldier with little knowledge of statecraft. He surrounded himself with trusted advisors, the most prominent being his nephew Flavius Petrus Sabbatius, whom he adopted as his son and invested with the name Iustinianus (Justinian). Another was the quaestor Proclus. Because Justin couldn't write or read the palace created a stencil from a piece of wood carved with four letters that spelled the Latin word LEGI which means "I have read".

=== Foreign affairs ===
The extent of the Byzantine Empire under Justin I is shown in brown. (The light orange shows the conquests of his successor, Justinian.)

Justin endeavoured to cultivate client states on the borders of the Empire, and avoided any significant warfare until late in his reign.

In 497 Anastasius had agreed with Theoderic, the Ostrogothic king of Italy, that he would rule Italy as Anastasius' deputy. This preserved Italy as nominally a part of the Empire, and neutralised a potentially dangerous neighbour. The arrangement suited Theodoric, as the Ostrogoths were a small aristocratic minority in Italy and the blessing of Constantinople helped reconcile the majority of the population to their rule. The feelings of the majority of Italians towards the Empire were mixed, as Anastasius was a Miaphysite, while they were Chalcedonian. The Ostrogoths were Arians, and there was a tendency to consider both them and Miaphysites as different breeds of heretics. With a strongly Chalcedonian emperor on the throne and the Italian-based papacy formally healing the rift the situation became less stable. Initially relations were friendly. Theodoric's son-in-law Eutharic was appointed consul in Constantinople in 519 and confirmed as Theodoric's heir. Eutharic died in 522, by which time Justin's policies, possibly influenced by Justinian, had become more anti-Arian. In 526 Theodoric died, leaving Eutharic's ten-year-old son Athalaric as heir to the throne.

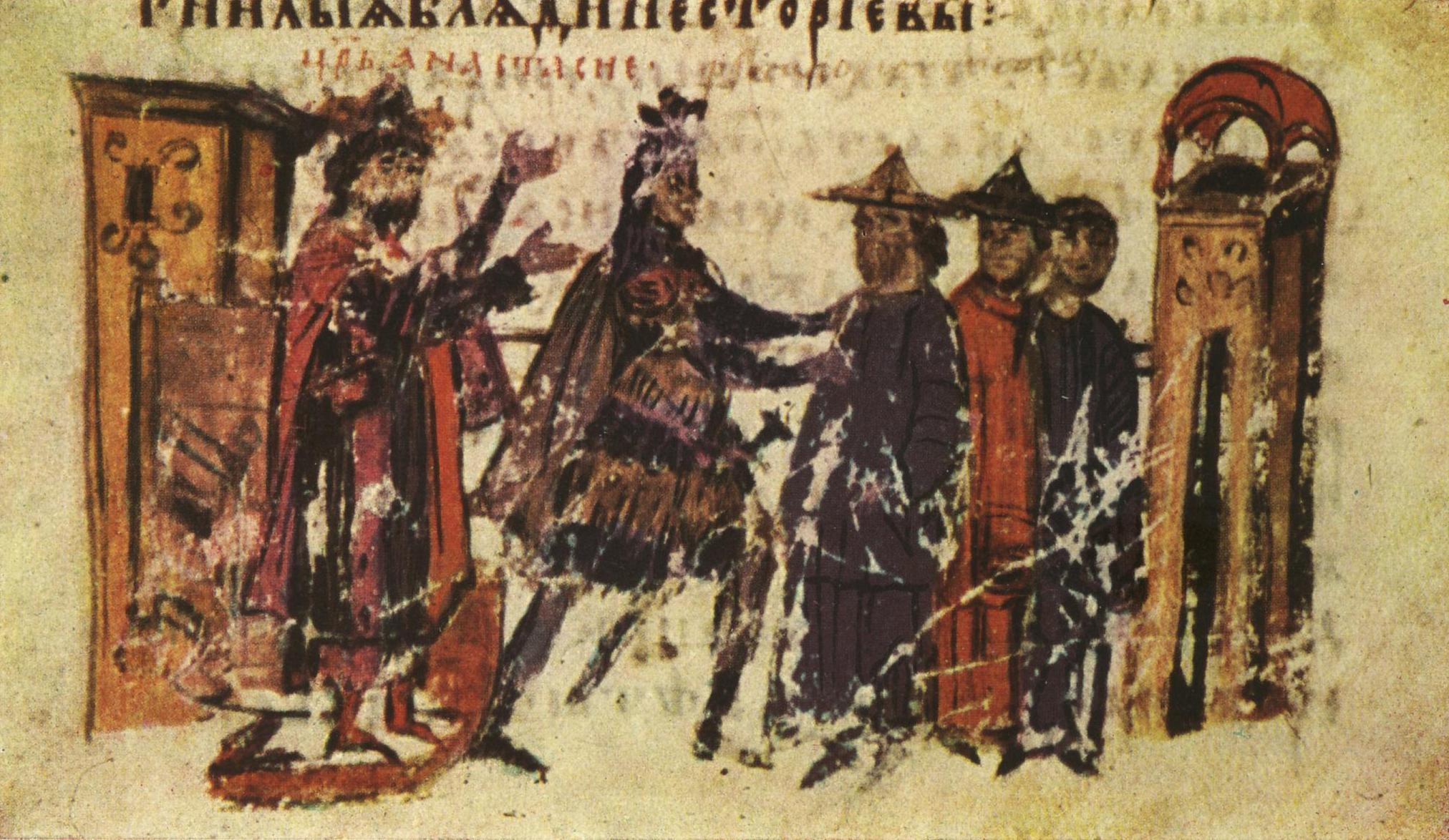
Justin I (left) persecuting Miaphysites, miniature from the 12th century Manasses Chronicle

A number of initiatives in respect of neighbouring states were founded on religious motives, and were usually developed by Justinian as he assumed more power towards the end of Justin's reign. Kaleb I of Aksum was probably encouraged to aggressively enlarge his empire by Justin. Contemporary chronicler John Malalas reported that Byzantine merchants were robbed and killed by the Jewish king of the south Arabian kingdom of Himyar, causing Kaleb to claim, "You have acted badly because you have killed merchants of the Christian Romans, which is a loss both to myself and my kingdom." Himyar was a client state of the Sassanian Persians, perennial enemies of the Byzantines. After Kaleb invaded Himyar around 523, Justin saw what is now Yemen pass from Sassanian control to the rule of an allied Christian state.

A number of small states on the borders of the Byzantine Empire and of Sassanian Persia were constant areas of contention between the two powers. The Georgian Principality of Iberia was in the Sassanian sphere of influence, but was Christian. Iberian bishops were sent to Antioch in the Byzantine Empire to be consecrated. Vakhtang I of Iberia was encouraged into war with the Sassanians. A "fervent Christian", his religious policies were "part and parcel of his larger strategic aims". After a lengthy struggle he was defeated and Iberia subjugated as a Sassanian province in 522.

Lazica was another border state; it was Christian, but in the Sassanid sphere. Its king, Tzath, wished to weaken Sassanid influence. In 521 or 522, he went to Constantinople to receive the insignia and royal robes of kingship from Justin's hand and to make his submission. He was also baptized as a Christian and married a Byzantine noblewoman, Valeriana. After having been confirmed in his kingdom by the Byzantine emperor, he returned to Lazica. Shortly after Justin's death, the Sassanids attempted to forcibly regain control, but were beaten off with assistance from Justin's successor.

In 524, the Sassanid emperor Kavadh I approached Justin asking that he formally adopt his youngest son, Khosrow, in order to secure his succession over his elder, but less favoured, brothers. Justin was agreeable, but, aware that, being childless himself, an adopted Persian son would have a claim on the Byzantine throne, offered adoption according to barbarian custom. The Persians were insulted and broke off all negotiations. In 526, the Byzantines raided Persian Armenia at Justinian's initiative. Justinian was increasingly taking control of policy from his aging uncle. The raiding parties were led by two of Justinian's up-and-coming military protégees, Sittas and Belisarius. The raids achieved little, other than to make a statement of intent.

=== Religion ===
Justin's reign is noteworthy for the resolution of the Acacian schism between the eastern and western branches of the Christian church. On ascending the throne Justin invited Pope Hormisdas to Constantinople for negotiations. Justinian sent a similar, but separate, invitation; said to have been closer to a summons. Hormisdas promptly despatched a delegation to Constantinople with instructions to state the orthodox position rather than to negotiate. Carrying out a policy developed by his nephew Justinian, the future emperor, Justin endorsed Rome's view on the question of the dual nature of Christ. On 28 March 519, in the cathedral of Constantinople in the presence of a great throng of people, a reluctant Patriarch John II accepted the formula of Pope Hormisdas and the end of the schism was concluded in a solemn ceremony.

For the first three years of his reign Justin persecuted the Miaphysites, even serving soldiers. Thereafter he adopted a more pragmatic approach. In 523 Justin issued a strict edict against Arianism. Theodoric, King of the Ostrogoths and ruler of Italy, was an Arian himself, as were most Ostrogoths. He despatched Pope John I, Pope Hormisdas' successor, to Constantinople with firm instructions to obtain a policy reversal. John received an exceptionally warm welcome; the population of Constantinople applauded him, Justin laid on celebrations, prostrated himself at the Pope's feet and insisted on being re-crowned by the Pope's hands. John did not succeed in having the edict overturned, it seems that he did not press the matter. On his return to Italy an enraged Theodoric had him flung into prison, where he shortly died.

Again encouraged by Justinian, Justin increasingly expressed his position as emperor as a religious one. He claimed that "we have been elected to the empire by favour of the indivisible Trinity. Edicts were endorsed with "We continuously commit ourselves to all plans and actions in the name of Jesus Christ". In either 519 or 522 Justin abandoned the tradition of depicting pagan symbols on the reverse of his coins and seals. "During the reign, the characteristic identifying the reverse female figure as Victory, a high girdle below the breasts, was substituted by a tunic, therefore identifying the figure as an angel." This was a very public and widespread restatement of the Empire as a Christian state.

=== Later years ===
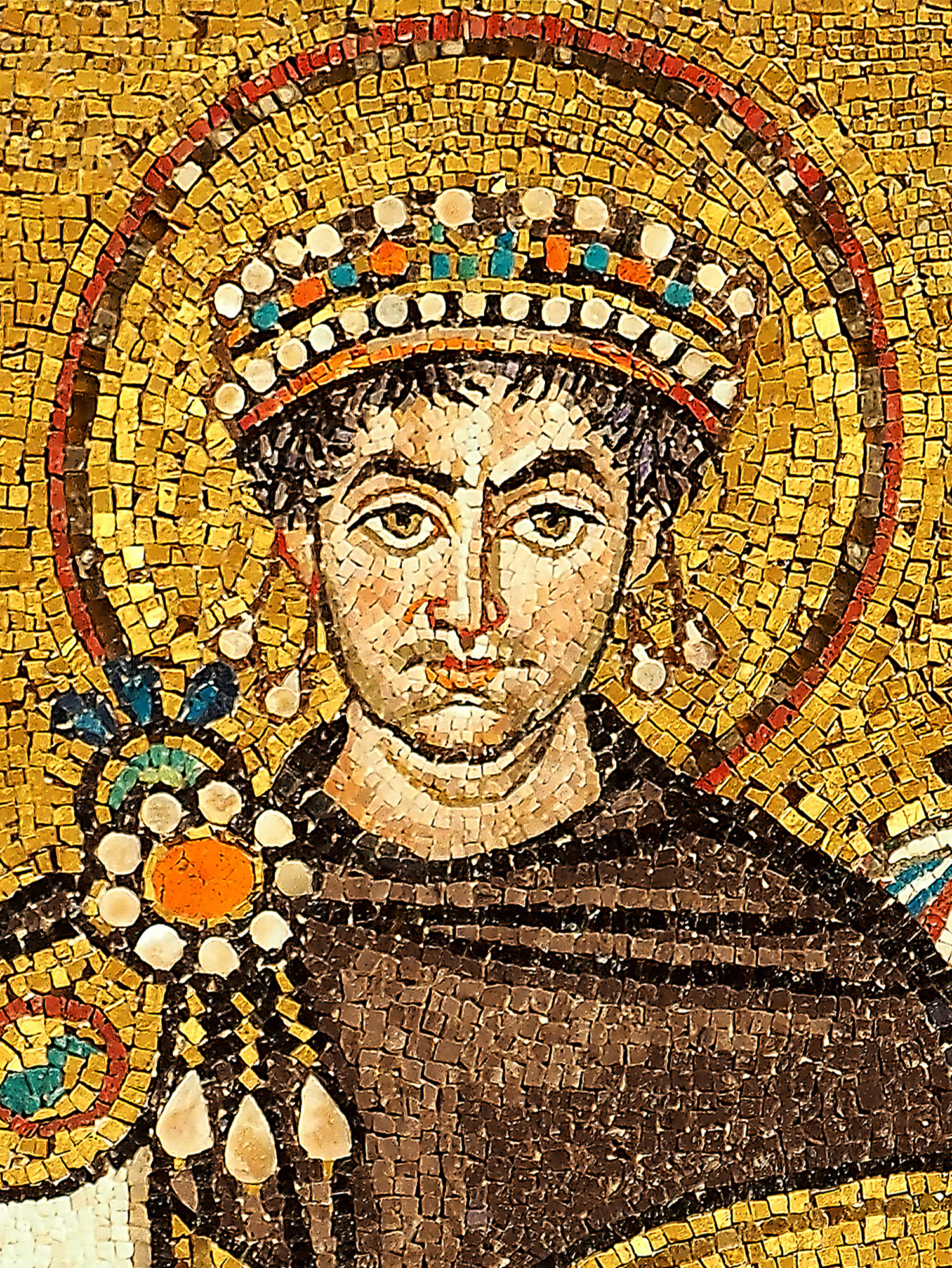
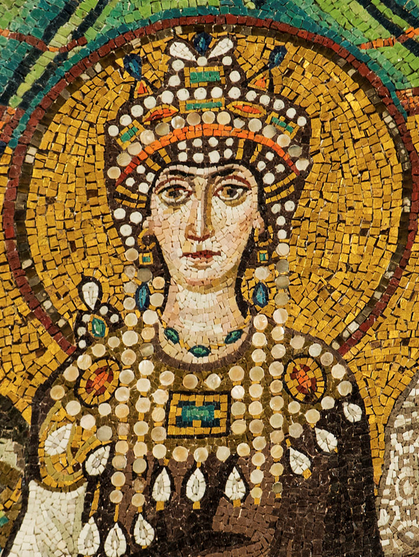
Mosaics of Justinian I and his wife Theodora, Basilica of San Vitale, 547

The later years of the reign of Justin were marked by increased tension with the Empire's neighbours, especially the Ostrogoths, and the Sassanids. In 526 Antioch was destroyed by an earthquake with an estimated 250,000 deaths. Justin arranged for sufficient money to be sent to the city for both immediate relief and to start reconstruction. The rebuilding of the Great Church and many other buildings was overseen by Ephraim, the comes Orientis, whose efforts saw him replace Euphrasius as the Chalcedonian patriarch of Antioch. Many of the buildings erected after the earthquake were destroyed by another major earthquake in November 528, although there were far fewer casualties.

Procopius of Caesarea's Byzantine historia indicate that Justin I's mental faculties had begun to decline in his old age, going as far as to write "the Emperor, as an idiot and advanced in age, caused the laugh of the environment, and was also accused of delays in decisions and inability for his duties."

== Justinian ==
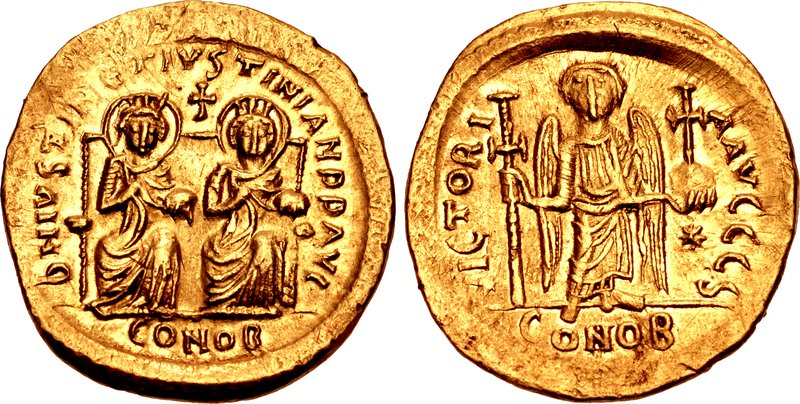
Solidus depicting Justin and Justinian.

During his uncle's reign Justinian successively occupied the positions of candidatus, patrician, a consul (in 521), and then a general. In 524, Justin issued an edict that allowed repentant actresses to marry senators, paving the way for Justinian to marry Theodora, a former mime actress. In 525, Justin elevated Justinian as caesar. Justin's health began to decline and he formally named Justinian as co-emperor and, on 1 April 527, as his successor. On 1 August Justin died and was succeeded by Justinian.

== Legacy ==
The Cilician city of Caesarea was renamed Justinopolis in 525, in honour of Justin I. The name persisted until the 12th century when Thoros I, king of Armenian Cilicia, made it his capital and renamed it Anazarbus.

== See also ==
- List of Byzantine emperors

== Footnotes ==
Justin I Justinian Dynasty Born: c. 450 Died: 1 August 527
Regnal titles
| Preceded by Anastasius I | Byzantine emperor 518–527 with Justinian I (527) | Succeeded by Justinian I |
Political offices
| Preceded by Anastasius Paulus Probus; Moschianus Probus Magnus (alone) | Roman consul 519 with Eutharic | Succeeded by Rusticius, Vitalianus |
| Preceded by Anicius Maximus (alone) | Roman consul II; 524 with Venantius Opilio | Succeeded by Probus, Theodorus Filoxenus Sotericus Filoxenus |
