= Probus (consul 525) =

6th century Consul of the Ostrogothic Kingdom

Anicius Probus (fl. 525) was a Roman senator living in the Ostrogothic Kingdom who served as the consul of the year 525. He is called "Junior" or "Iunior" in some sources, probably for confusion with Olybrius, a child who served as consul in 491.

He married Proba, daughter of Olybrius and wife Irene, a niece of Eastern Roman Emperor Anastasius I. With her he had a daughter, Juliana, who married Anastasius, son of Anastasius Paulus Probus Sabinianus Pompeius Anastasius, consul in 517, by his marriage to Empress Theodora's illegitimate daughter, whose name has not survived.

== Bibliography ==
- Cameron, Alan (1984). "Junior Consuls", Zeitschrift für Papyrologie und Epigraphik, 56, p. 162.
- Martindale, John R., ed. (1980). "Fl. Probus iunior 10". The Prosopography of the Later Roman Empire: Volume II, AD 395–527. Cambridge: Cambridge University Press. p. 913. ISBN 0-521-20159-4.

Political offices
Preceded by Justin I, Venantius Opilio	Roman consul 525 with Theodorus Filoxenus Sotericus Filoxenus	Succeeded by Olybrius
