= Vettius Agorius Basilius Mavortius =

Roman politician and aristocrat

Vettius Agorius Basilius Mavortius (fl. 527–534) was a Roman aristocrat who lived during Ostrogothic rule. He was appointed consul for 527.

== Biography ==
Mavortius was probably the son of Caecina Mavortius Basilius Decius, consul in 486, and related to Vettius Agorius Praetextatus, an influential aristocrat of the late 4th century. In 527, Mavortius held the positions of Comes domesticorum (Commander of the Imperial Guard) and consul.

Subscriptions in three manuscripts containing the works of Horace state that Mavortius emended one text of that poet in the sixth century. The scholar Vollmer believed Mavortius' copy was the archetype of the entire tradition, but R. J. Tarrant argues that the subscription was copied from Mavortius' manuscript into an unrelated book, then found its way into the three surviving manuscripts – which otherwise belong to different branches of the manuscript transmission. A subscription with Mavortius' name also appears in a sixth-century manuscript of Prudentius.

== Notes ==
Political offices
| Preceded by Olybrius | Roman consul 527 | Succeeded by Justinian I |
