= Theocritus (comes domesticorum) =

Theocritus (Greek: Θεόκριτος; died 518) was a candidate to the throne of the Eastern Roman Empire in 518. He lost to Justin I.

== Sources ==
Theocritus is an obscure individual, primarily mentioned by two authors: John Malalas and Marcellinus Comes. The former mentions him as a domestikos (Greek: δομέστικος; a civil, ecclesiastic or military officer). The latter mentions him as the satelles (Latin: "attendant" or "guard") of Amantius. He is also mentioned in the accounts of Zacharias Rhetor, Evagrius Scholasticus, Jordanes, the Chronicon Paschale, Theophanes the Confessor and Joannes Zonaras. Both Malalas and the Chronicon mention him by the title of comes, making it likely that his full title was "comes domesticorum". Procopius does not mention him by name, but a passage of his sheds some light on the circumstances of his death.

== Candidate for the throne ==
When Anastasius I (r. 491–518) died childless, without designating an heir, and without a reigning Augusta to supervise the election of a successor, the throne was up for grabs. According to Malalas, the powerful praepositus sacri cubiculi Amantius had intended to elect a comes domesticorum, commander of an elite guard unit of the late Roman Empire, by the name of Theocritus to the throne. Amantius hoped to secure the election for Theocritus by bribing Justin, the comes excubitorum (head of the imperial guards). Justin was supposed to share the money with his troops.

The events of the election were described in detail by Peter the Patrician, extracts of whose work survive in the 10th-century De Ceremoniis. On the morning of the election the Excubitors at first put forward the tribune John as a candidate. He was raised on the shield in the Hippodrome of Constantinople. But the Blues, an influential chariot racing faction, rioted against this candidate. The guardsmen of the Scholae Palatinae then attempted to proclaim their own candidate, but the Excubitors almost killed that unnamed man. The Excubitors then allegedly put forward Justinian, nephew of Justin, as their second candidate for the day, but he refused the crown. The Byzantine Senate supposedly settled the matter by electing Justin himself.

Evagrius Scholasticus and Zacharias Rhetor imply that Justin was working in his own interest alone. John Bagnell Bury concludes that Justin used the money to buy support for himself. Bury believed that Justin also orchestrated many of the events of that day. Justin and his supporters knew "that he could not count on the support of the Scholarians, and, if he were proclaimed by his own troops alone, the success of his cause would be doubtful. The problem therefore was to manage that the initiation should proceed from the Senate, whose authority, supported by the excubitors, would rally general consent and overpower the resistance of the Scholarian guards. It was therefore arranged that the Excubitors should propose candidates who had no chance of being chosen, with the design of working on the fears of the Senate. Justin's friends in the Senate could argue with force: "Hasten to agree, or you will be forestalled, and some wholly unsuitable person will be thrust upon us. But you must choose one who will be acceptable to the Excubitors. Justin fulfills this condition. He may not be an ideal candidate for the throne, but he is old and moderate." But, however the affair may have been managed by the wirepullers, Justin ascended the throne with the prestige of having been regularly nominated by the Senate, and he could announce to the Pope that "We have been elected to the Empire by the favour of the indivisible Trinity, by the choice of the highest ministers of the sacred Palace, and of the Senate, and finally by the election of the army."

== Death ==
Both Amantius and Theocritus were soon executed on a pretext. They were obviously eliminated by Justin for their role in the conspiracy. Procopius briefly mentions: "Indeed, his power [Justin's] was not ten days old, before he slew Amantius, chief of the palace eunuchs, and several others, on no graver charge than that Amantius had made some rash remark about John, Archbishop of the city. After this, he was the most feared of men." Based on the account of Marcellinus, Amantius and his supporters were accused of being adherents of Manichaeism. A combination of sources imply that Amantius and Theocritus had attempted to overthrow Justin, following his election. If so, they were met with swift executions.

== Sources ==
- Bury, John Bagnell (1958) [1923], History of the Later Roman Empire: From the Death of Theodosius I to the Death of Justinian, Volume 2, Mineola, New York: Dover Publications, OCLC 41478187
- Martindale, John R., ed. (1980). The Prosopography of the Later Roman Empire: Volume II, AD 395–527. Cambridge: Cambridge University Press. ISBN 0-521-20159-4.
