= Venantius Opilio =

Roman politician

Venantius Opilio (floruit 500–534) was a Roman politician during the reign of Theodoric the Great. Although he was consul as the junior colleague of emperor Justin I in 524, Opilio is best known as one of the three men whom Boethius claimed in his De consolatione philosophiae provided evidence of his treason against king Theodoric, an act which led to Boethius' imprisonment and death.

== Life ==
According to one of the letters written by Cassiodorus, Opilio was the brother of Cyprianus, and brother-in-law to Basilius; this Basilius is commonly identified with the Basilius who appears in two of Cassiodorus' letters as accused of practicing black magic. Cyprianus was the referandarius who accused Boethius of treasonous correspondence with the emperor of the Eastern Roman Empire, while Boethius names Basilius as another of the three witnesses against him.

Boethius alleges that Opilio, along with the last of the three witnesses, Gaudentius, had been banished for fraud by Theodoric, and had taken sanctuary within Ravenna, when the two of them denounced Boethius. However, John Moorhead has listed a number of sources which portray Opilio in a far different light. He received two letters from Magnus Felix Ennodius, the bishop of Pavia, which were probably written in the first decade of the sixth century (Epistulae I.22; V.3); neither contains anything disreputable about Opilio. In 524 he was appointed consul. The Ostrogothic monarchs selected him in 526 to announce the accession of Theoderic's successor to the inhabitants of Liguria in 526. A few years afterwards he was picked to accompany the patrician Liberius on an embassy to Constantinople. Moorhead notes that Opilio also appears to have been in good standing with the contemporary church: in 529 he was a lay signatory at the Second Council of Orange, and in 534 he was included among the addressees of a circular on christology distributed by Pope John II. The last item Moorhead provides is an inscription from Padua suggesting Opilio had constructed a number of churches. "We may," observes Moorhead, "therefore say that Opilio lived the life of a typical Roman noble and was accepted as such by Ennodius, Faustus, Liberius, Pope John II and the Ostrogothic government."

His life following his diplomatic mission to the Imperial court is unknown.

== Notes ==
Political offices
Preceded by Anicius Maximus (alone)	Consul of the Roman Empire; 524 with Flavius Iustinus Augustus II	Succeeded by Anicius Probus Iunior; Theodorus Filoxenus Sotericus Filoxenus
