= Rufius Petronius Nicomachus Cethegus =

Roman consul of the Ostrogothic era

Rufius Petronius Nicomachus Cethegus was a politician of Ostrogothic Italy and the Eastern Roman Empire. He was appointed consul for 504 AD, and held the post without a colleague. His father was Petronius Probinus, the consul for 489 and prominent supporter of Antipope Laurentius.

John Moorhead has proposed identifying Cethegus with a Petronius of Rome, who with a Renatus of Ravenna, debated Severus of Antioch on the nature of Christ while Severus resided in Constantinople (508–511). If correct, this identification would put Cethegus in a circle of aristocratic intellectuals around Boethius.

In December 546, when the King of the Ostrogoths, Totila, overcame the Byzantine defences and entered the city of Rome, Cethegus, who by his seniority had become president of the Senate ('caput senatus'), Decius (who had been consul in 529), and Anicius Faustus Albinus Basilius (who had been consul in 541) fled Rome with general Bessas. According to the Liber Pontificalis, Cethegus and Basilius reached Constantinople where the Emperor Justinian I consoled them "and enriched them as befitted Roman consuls."

While residing in Constantinople, Justinian twice used Cethegus' services to negotiate with Pope Vigilius over the latter's refusal to condemn the Three Chapters: the first was in late 551, when Vigilius had fled the Placidia Palace and sought sanctuary in the Basilica of St. Peter of Hormisdas; the second in Spring 552, when Vigilius had again fled the Placidia Palace shortly before Christmas, and this time finding sanctuary in the Church of St. Euphemia in Chalcedon.

He was still alive in 558.

Political offices
Preceded by Volusianus; Dexicrates	Roman consul 504	Succeeded by Theodorus; Sabinian
