= De situ terrae sanctae =

Short 6th-century report of a pilgrimage to the Holy Land

De situ terrae sanctae is a short 6th-century report of a pilgrimage to the Holy Land. Its author is identified in a 9th-century manuscript (Codex Vaticanus 6018) as a German archdeacon named Theodosius.

The work includes a list of places and routes, and occasionally commentary on relevant biblical passages, combining the genre of itinerarium with stories reminiscent of a modern travelogue. It was compiled after 518 and before 530, as the author is aware of the construction work done under Emperor Anastasius I (r. 491–518), but not of that done under Justinian I (r. 527–565).

== Theodosius' additional sources ==
Tsafrir (1986) has argued that the topographical information in the work is based on maps used by tour guides, also reflected in the Madaba Map of the same period. The author inserted additional information based either on his own travels or on accounts by other pilgrims.

== Contents ==
The text is divided into 32 sections or paragraphs.

- Sections 1–6, 27 and 32 have the character of an Itinerarium.
- The holy sites in Jerusalem are described in sections 7–11, 17, 21 and 31),
- interspersed with descriptions of holy sites in Asia Minor (12–13, 15, 26), Egypt (14), the Jordan Valley (18–20), Phoenicia (23) and Arabia (24).
- The biblical geography of Jordan is given in section 22,
- a biblical geography of Paradise in section 16.
- A list of provinces in the Holy Land is given in section 25.
- Three sections are short narratives: on Urbicius and the Seat of Mary (28), the Sassanid Persians in Dara (29), Eudoxius on Melitene and Susa (30).

== Survival, manuscripts, and modern editions ==
The work was known to the 6th-century Gallo-Roman historian and bishop Gregory of Tours. It was also included in the Otia Imperialia by Gervase of Tilbury (c. 1211).

Notable manuscripts include codd. Guelferbytanus (Weissenburg 99) (8th/9th c.), Haganus 165 (8th c.), Vaticanus 6018 (9th c.) and Parisinus 4808 (9th c.).

The text was edited by T. Tobler (1865), T. Tobler and A. Molinier (1879), J. Gildemeister (1882), J. Pomialowsky (1891) and P. Geyer (1898). It has also been translated into a number of European languages. English translations include those by J. H. Bernard (1893) and J. Wilkinson (1977).
