= Eusebius (praepositus sacri cubiculi) =

Politician and eunuch

Eusebius (died 361 AD) was a high-ranking officer of the Roman Empire, holding the position of praepositus sacri cubiculi during the rule of Emperor Constantius II (337-361).

== Biography ==
Eusebius held the position of praepositus sacri cubiculi in 337, when Constantine I died; he concealed the will of the Emperor. Eusebius became a supporter of Arianism, influencing the empress and many other eunuchs. He entered then at the service of one of Constantine's sons and successors, Constantius II, with whom he shared the support for Arianism and on whom he exerted a great influence.

In 354 Eusebius was sent by Constantius II to talk to Pope Liberius and then attended at the meeting between the Emperor and the Pope. He sent money to the orator Libanius in exile and, in 355, helped those Arian bishops who plotted against Athanasius of Alexandria.

Eusebius followed Constantius into Gaul (353-354) and then to Milan (354). Here he plotted against Constantius' cousin, brother-in-law and Caesar, Constantius Gallus; Constantius ordered him to go to Pula, where Gallus was imprisoned, to question him about his rule in the East.

Eusebius enriched himself taking the properties of those who were put to death on accusations of treason; when general Ursicinus refused to give him as a present his house in Antioch, in 359, Eusebius had him recalled from his office as magister equitum, having Sabinianus as a substitute.

Eusebius was together with Constantius until the Emperor died, in 361. The new Emperor, Julian, set up the Chalcedon tribunal to judge all those officers of Constantius' who had been suspected of corrupt conduct, in particular in the case of the trial and execution of Gallus (Julian's half-brother); Eusebius was accused of plotting against Gallus, was found guilty, and was put to death.

== Sources ==
=== Primary sources ===
- Ammianus Marcellinus, Res gestae ("Roman History").
- Athanasius, Historia Arianorum ("History of the Arians").
- Julian, Letter to the Athenians.
- Libanius, Orationes ("Orations").
- Palladius of Galatia, Historia Lausiaca ("Lausiac History").
- Philostorgius, Historia Ecclesiastica ("History of the Church").
- Photius, Bibliotheca
- Socrates, Historia Ecclesiastica ("History of the Church").
- Sozomen, Historia Ecclesiastica ("History of the Church").
- Theodoret, Historia Ecclesiastica ("History of the Church").
- Zonaras, Epitome Historiarum ("Extracts of History").

=== Secondary sources ===
- Martindale, John R.; Jones, A. H. M.; Morris, John, eds. (1971). "Eusebius 11". The Prosopography of the Later Roman Empire: Volume I, AD 260–395. Cambridge: Cambridge University Press. pp. 302–303. ISBN 0-521-07233-6.
