= Celer (magister officiorum) =

Byzantine soldier and official

Flavius Celer (Greek: Κέλερ) was a Byzantine general and magister officiorum under Emperor Anastasius (r. 491–518) in the early 6th century.

== Biography ==
Celer was an Illyrian though nothing is known of his early life. In 503, Emperor Anastasius named him general in the ongoing war against the Sassanid Persians in the East. In the spring of 504, he led his men to participate in the ongoing siege of Amida, but soon after left and engaged in an invasion of Persian-held territory, retaking several cities and returning with much booty. In late 504, Celer engaged in negotiations with the Persians, which resulted in a temporary truce. In 505, he was again active on the eastern frontier, but is not reported to have engaged in major operations; he did, however, continue contacts with the Persians, ransoming Amida for 1,100 pounds of gold. In autumn 506, Celer led the Byzantine negotiations with the Persians at Dara, which resulted in the conclusion of a peace treaty. Perhaps as a reward, he was named consul for 508; he had already been appointed as magister officiorum sometime around 503 to 504.

In 511, Celer conspired with Emperor Anastasius in a plan to have the Patriarch of Constantinople, Macedonius, exiled by inducing Macedonius to sign a document that rejected the councils of Ephesus (431) and Chalcedon (451) and thus lose the support of the pro-Chalcedonian faction. Afterwards, Celer was ordered to ensure that Severus and his Monophysite monks were safely returned to their convents in Syria. In 512, Celer was sent to Constantinople, along with Patricius, to pacify the riotous Chalcedonian crowds, but ultimately failed.

Celer was still in office at the time of the ascension of Emperor Justin I (r. 518–527) on 9 July 518, but was soon after removed from office (his first recorded successor was Tatianus in 520 though Symmachus may have held the position in 519). Following that, he participated in the negotiations of 519–520 with the Patriarch of Rome to end the Acacian Schism. He is described by chroniclers as wise, well-educated, a capable administrator, and personally brave. The date or manner of his death is not recorded, save for a reference to it being "unfortunate".

== Sources ==
- Bury, John Bagnell (2008) [1889]. History of the Later Roman Empire from Arcadius to Irene, Volume I. New York, New York: Cosimo, Incorporated. ISBN 978-1-60-520404-8.
- Martindale, John R., ed. (1980). The Prosopography of the Later Roman Empire: Volume II, AD 395–527. Cambridge: Cambridge University Press. ISBN 0-521-20159-4.

Preceded by Anastasius Augustus III; Venantius	Roman consul 508 with Basilius Venantius	Succeeded by Inportunus
