= Decius Paulinus =

Roman Consul (534)

(Decius) Paulinus (fl. 534), sometimes referred to as “Paulinus Junior" to distinguish him from Paulinus (consul 498), was a Roman aristocrat and politician. He served as the last consul of the Roman Senate, as after his term, consuls would be appointed in the East alone.

== Life ==
Paulinus was the son of Basilius Venantius (consul in 508) and brother of Decius (consul in 529), thus making him a member of the Decia gens. Paulinus is not explicitly given the nomen Decius in any source, but it can be inferred since he belonged to the gens. In September 533, he was appointed consul by Athalaric, king of the Ostrogoths, who announced his election to the Senate. He started his term in January 534, his colleague being the Byzantine emperor Justinian I. Paulinus was the last consul to be appointed in the West.

Political offices
Preceded by Fl. Petrus Sabbatius Iustinianus Augustus III, III post consulatum Lampadii et Orestis (West)	Roman consul 534 AD; With: Fl. Petrus Sabbatius Iustinianus Augustus IV	Succeeded by Fl. Belisarius, Post consulatum Paulini (West)
