= Church of the Seat of Mary =

5th-century Byzantine church in the Holy Land

- Ecclesia Kathismatis (Latin)
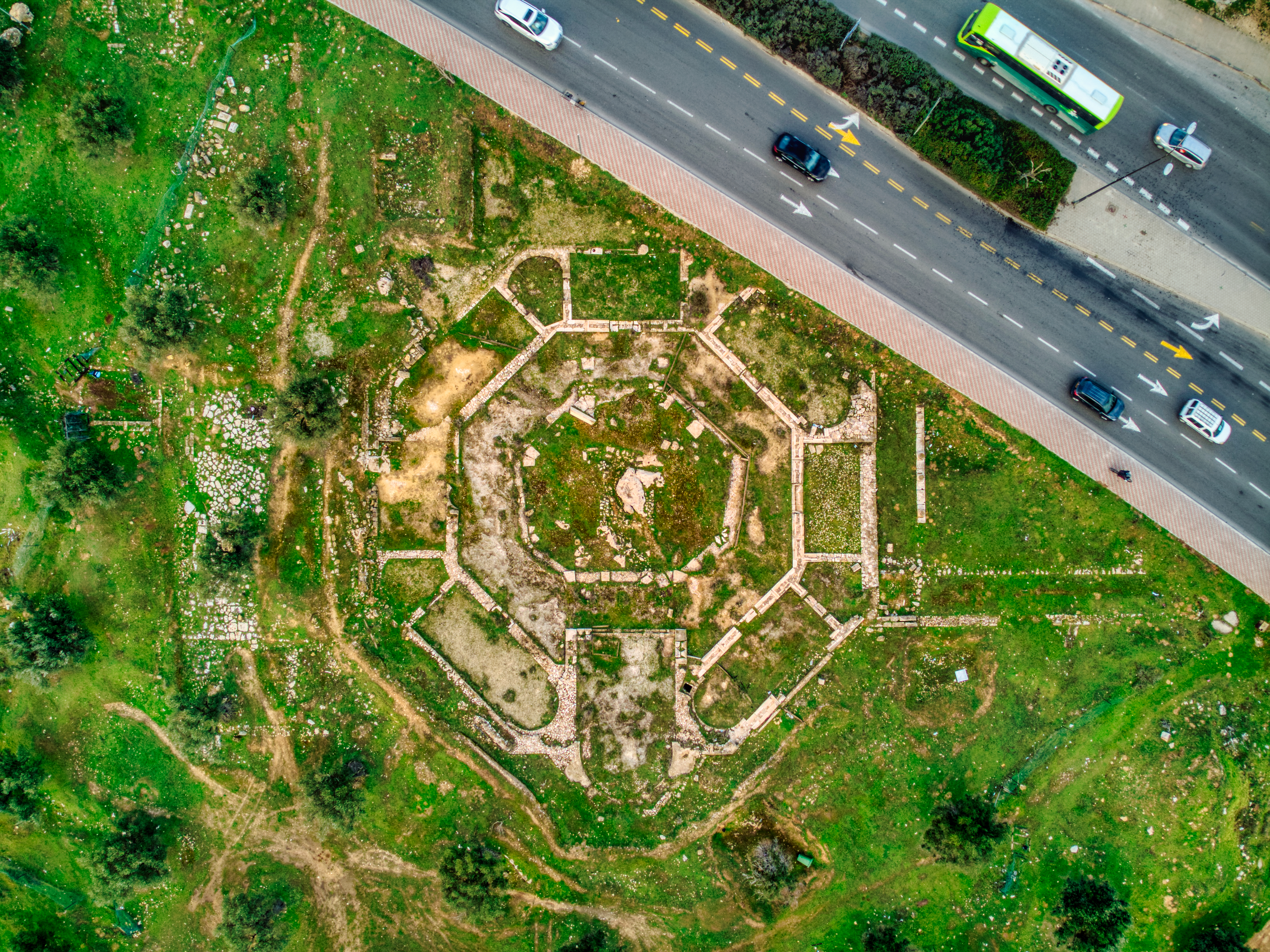
- Church of the Seat of Mary - Church of the Kathisma

- Location within Israel Location within Jerusalem
- 31.7392°N 35.2128°E
- Type: Church
- Location: Between Jerusalem and Bethlehem
- Region: Byzantine Empire

History
- Built: 456 CE
- Abandoned: 10th century

Site notes
- Excavation dates: 1997
- Condition: Ruins
- Public access: Yes

The Church of the Seat of Mary (Latin: Ecclesia Kathismatis, from Greek: κάθισμα, romanized: kathisma, lit. 'seat'), Church of the Kathisma or Old Kathisma being the name mostly used in literature, was a 5th-century Byzantine church in the Holy Land, located between Jerusalem and Bethlehem in East Jerusalem, on what is today known as Hebron Road.

It was built on the alleged resting place of Mary on the road to Bethlehem mentioned in the apocryphal Proto-Gospel of James. The church was built following the First Council of Ephesus of 431. It is one of the earliest churches known to have been dedicated to the Theotokos (Mary "the God-bearer") in the entire Byzantine Empire. It was converted into a mosque in the 8th century, destroyed after the Crusader period, and forgotten until its accidental discovery in 1992.

== History ==
Archaeological excavations revealed possible remains of a small shrine from the first half of the 5th century, but mainly a large and lavish octagonal church and its monastery, originally built around 456 by the widow Ikelia, and substantially restored sometime between 531–538.

The southern doorway was turned into a mihrab in the first half of the 8th century, while the rest of the structure is thought to have still been used as a church. Other structural changes include the blocking of the eastern apse and a remodelling of the mosaic floors. Scholars hold that the church was abandoned during the 10th century and slowly carried off for its building materials.

=== New Marian cult ===
The Kathisma was the earliest church strictly dedicated to Mary in Jerusalem and the surrounding area. It was dedicated to the Theotokos, "Birth Giver of God", much in accordance with the decisions taken at the First Council of Ephesus in regard to Christian dogma in AD 431, and was built by Ikelia under the guidance of the bishop of Jerusalem, Juvenal, a participant in the Ephesus Council.

The church is connected to the introduction of the earliest strictly Marian feast, the celebration of the Theotokos, which was inaugurated by Juvenal at the Kathisma. At first it was set on 15 August, but had to be moved backward by two days, to 13 August, to make place for another Marian feast, the Assumption. The church was built in 456, five years after the Council of Chalcedon, which reaffirmed the decisions from Ephesus and finally granted Juvenal, as the bishop of Jerusalem, ecclesiastical independence, on the same footing with Rome, Constantinople, Alexandria and Antioch.

=== Candle procession ===
Ikelia introduced at Kathisma a new custom: a candle procession to mark the purification of the Virgin Mary at the Temple in Jerusalem forty days after the birth of Jesus. This custom then first spread to much of the Eastern Church, and later to the Western Church where it is known as 'Candlemas'.

=== An architectural model ===
The Old Kathisma was built as an octagonal martyrium. It has been noticed that the significant 5th-century octagonal churches built on Mount Gerizim and at Capernaum, as well as the late-7th-century Muslim Dome of the Rock, are all based on the same architectural pattern as the earlier Kathisma church, which might indicate that it served as the model for those buildings.

=== Fate ===
The church was converted into a mosque in the 8th century, destroyed after the Crusader period, and forgotten until its accidental discovery in 1992.

=== Rediscovery ===
The remains of the church were discovered accidentally during construction work of Highway 60 in 1992 near Mar Elias Monastery. The route of the highway was shifted to avoid damage to the site, so that the ruins are now just off the road, at the once municipal border between Jerusalem and Bethlehem before 1967. The site was excavated in 1997.

== Description ==
The building had an octagonal floor plan measuring 43 m × 52 m (141 ft × 171 ft), comparable to that of the 4th-century Church of the Nativity in Bethlehem and other Byzantine churches, imitated in the construction of the Muslim Dome of the Rock in the late 7th century, with the Kathisma rock in the center. Most of the rooms of the church were paved in coloured mosaics of floral and geometric designs, some of them added in the 8th century.

== Ancient sources ==
=== De Situ Terrae Sanctae (6th century) ===
The 6th-century De Situ Terrae Sanctae claims that the influential Byzantine court official Urbicius had the rock cut into rectangular shape, like an altar, and intended to have it moved to Constantinople, but no-one was able to move it beyond Jerusalem's St Stephen's Gate, so it was placed in the Church of the Resurrection right behind the tomb of Jesus, where it was used for the Eucharist.

=== Vita of St Theodosius (6th century) ===
The church is mentioned in a 6th-century hagiography of Theodosius the Cenobiarch, Vita Theodosii by Cyril of Scythopolis (c. 525–c. 559). According to this text, both the church and the monastery of Kathisma were built by a wealthy widow called Ikelia (Iqilia, Hicelia) during the reign of bishop Juvenal of Jerusalem (r. 422–458). Theodosius is said to have lived in the monastery as a young monk.

== Gallery ==
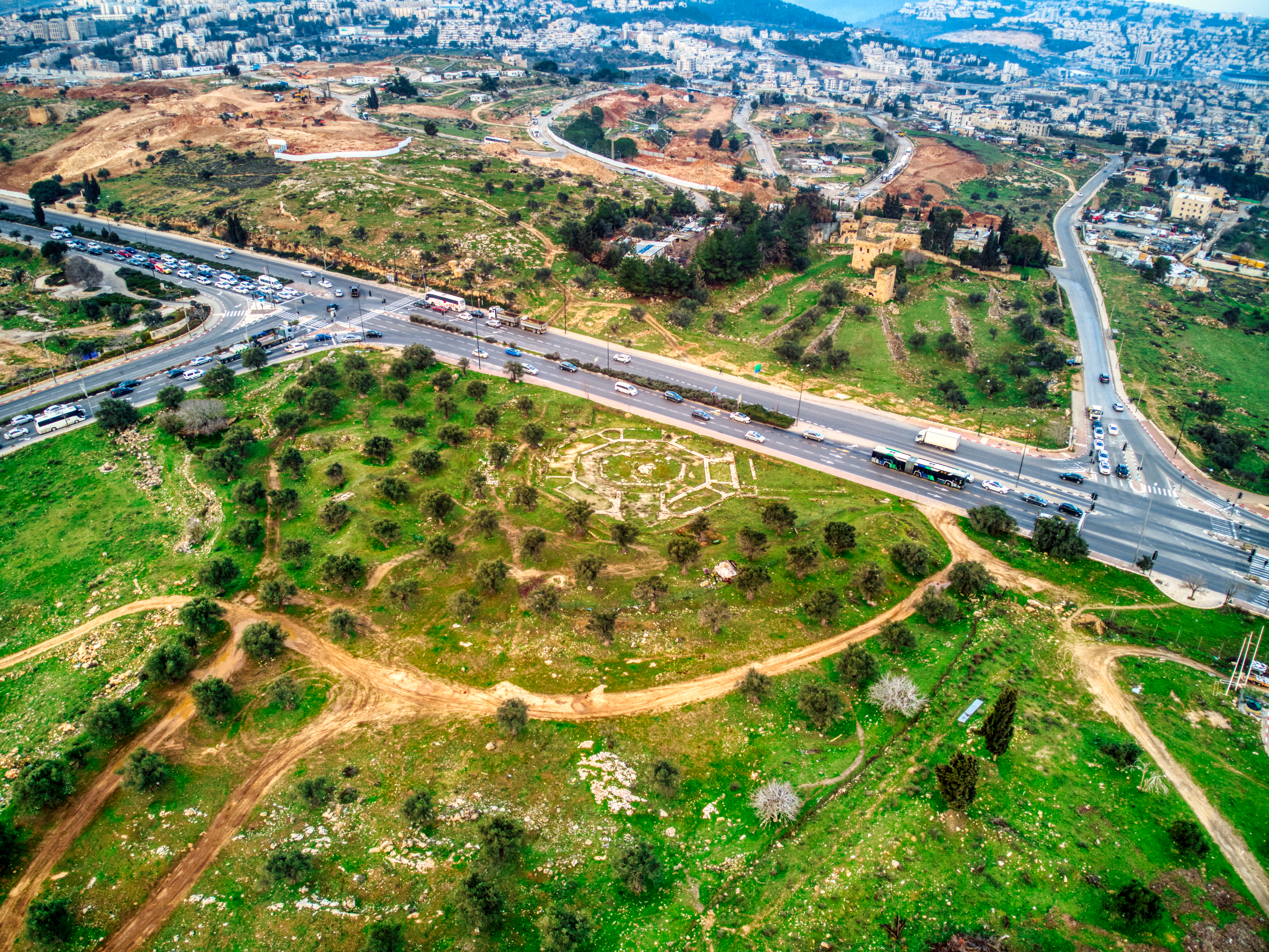
Church of the Kathisma and Givat HaMatos

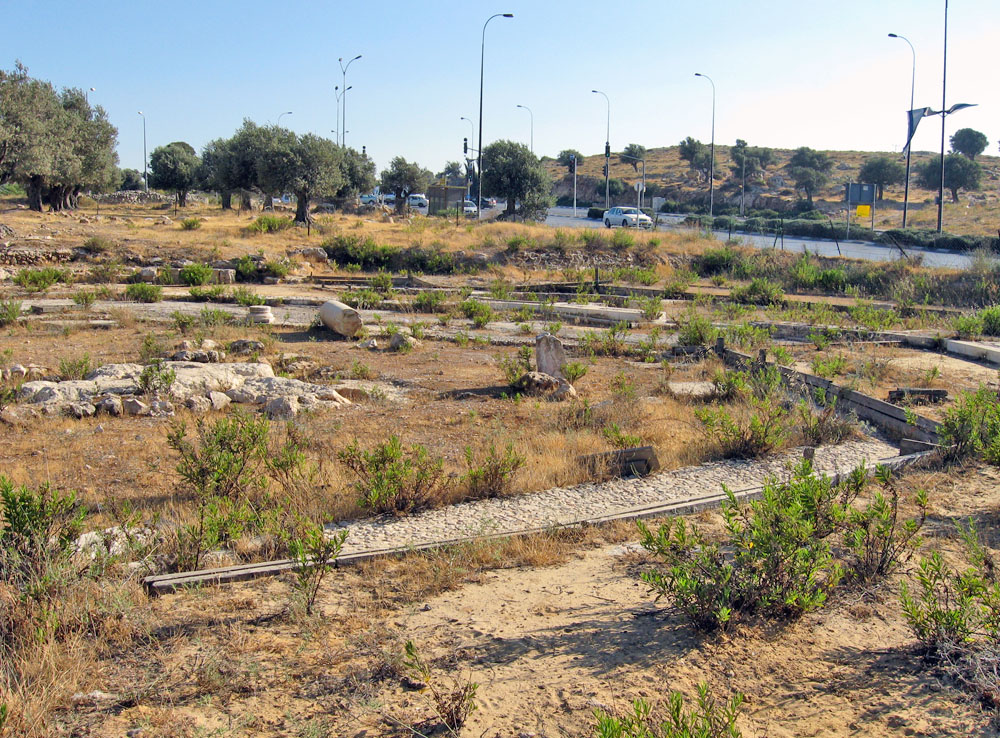
Remains of the church

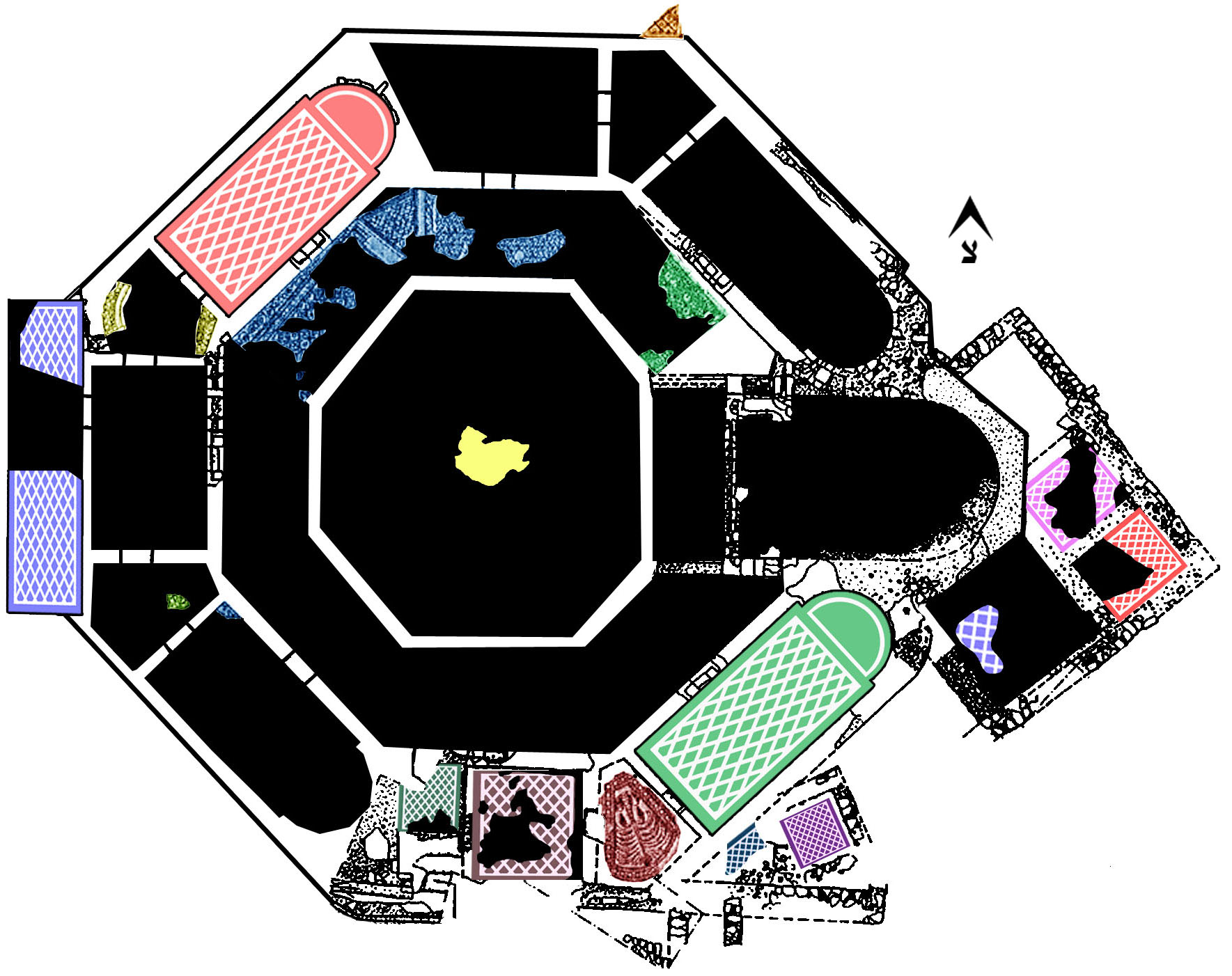
Octagonal plan of the church

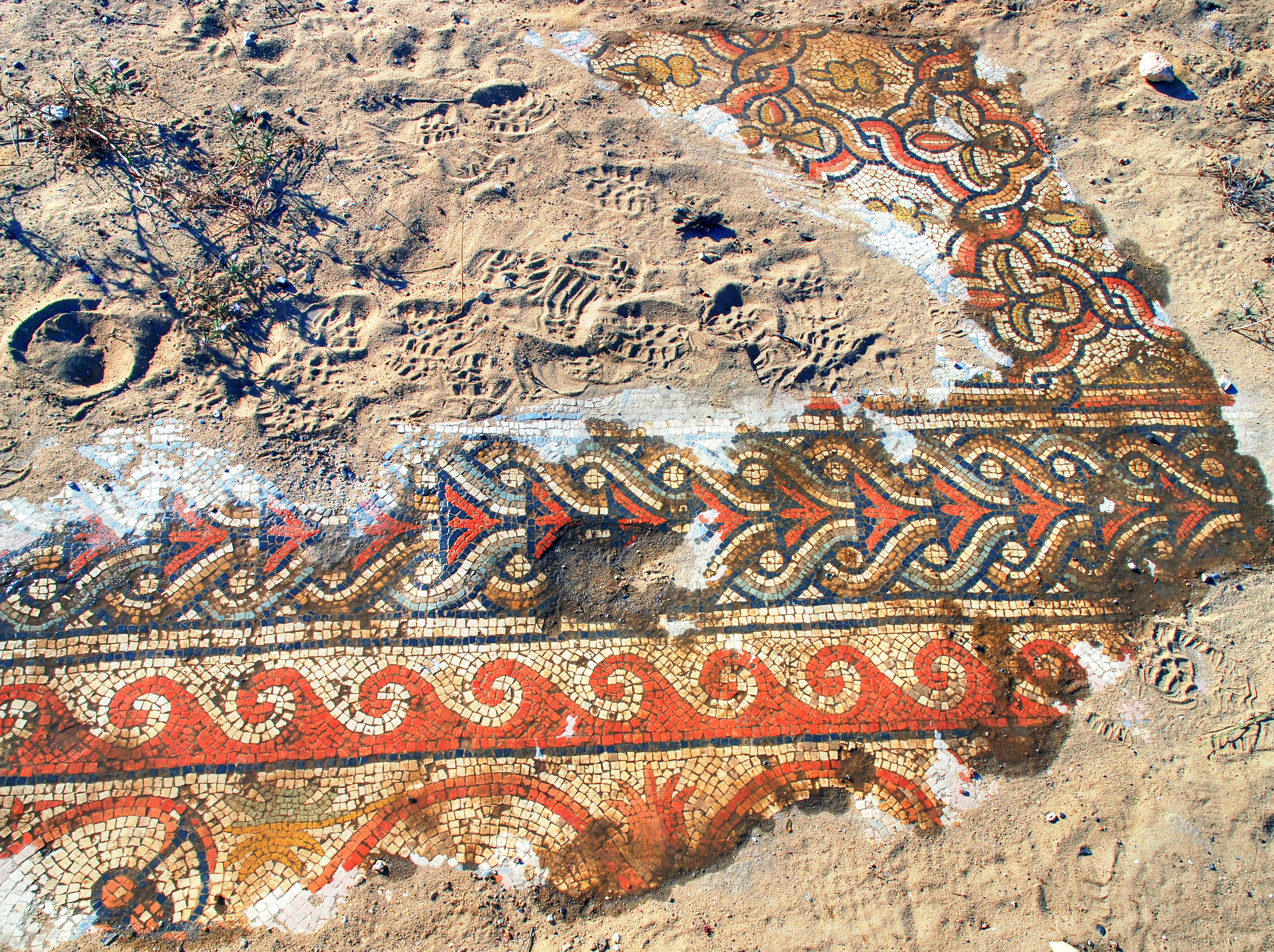
Fragment of the mosaic floor

== See also ==
- Ramat Rachel, nearby kibbutz, site of a related Byzantine monastery
- Symbolism of domes
