= Boethius (consul 522) =

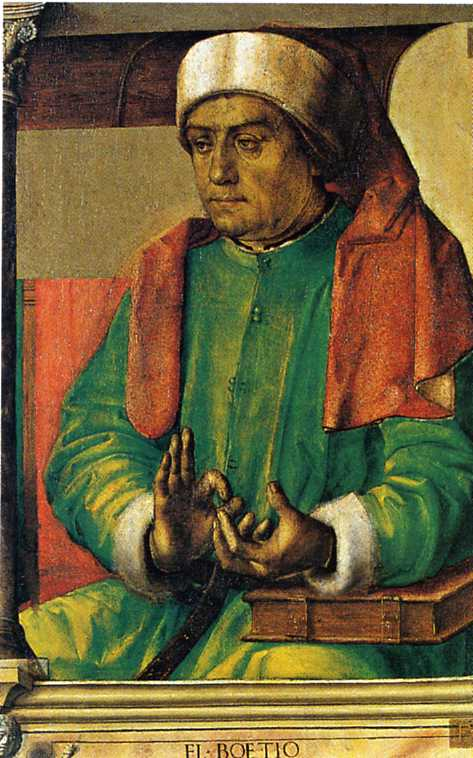
Fl Boetio (Flavio Boezio) - Studiolo di Federico da Montefeltro.

Flavius Boethius (fl. 522–526) was a Roman politician during the Ostrogothic kingdom in Italy.

== Life ==
Son of the philosopher Anicius Manlius Severinus Boethius and of Rusticiana (his aunts were Galla and Proba), Boethius was the brother of Symmachus, with whom he shared the consulate, chosen by the Ostrogothic court.

His father fell into disgrace with the Ostrogothic ruler and had his own property confiscated; at the death of king Theodoric the Great (526), these properties were given back to Boethius and Symmachus. Boethius is known to have served as praetorian prefect of Byzantine North Africa from 560 to 561.

John R.C. Martyn suggests that Boethius had three children:

- Boethius, who is known to be Primate of Byzacena in North Africa;
- Symmachus, a patrician, who was still alive in February 601;
- Rusticiana, a correspondent of Pope Gregory the Great and patron of the Catholic church in Rome; her daughter Eusebia married into the Apion family of Byzantine Egypt, and Eusebia's son was Strategius Apion.

== See also ==
- Flavia gens#As an imperial title

== Bibliography ==
- CIL IX, 2074 CIL X, 4496
- Martindale, John R., ed. (1980). "Fl. Boethius 3". The Prosopography of the Later Roman Empire: Volume II, AD 395–527. Cambridge: Cambridge University Press. p. 232. ISBN 0-521-20159-4.

Political offices
| Preceded by Petrus Sabbatius Iustinianus, Valerius | Roman consul 522 with Symmachus | Succeeded by Anicius Maximus |
