= Proclus Oneirocrites =

Proclus or Proklos (Greek: Πρόκλος) was surnamed Oneirocrites (Ὀνειροκρίτης, 'judge of dreams'), according to some authorities. He predicted the death of the emperor Anastasius. It appears to be this Proclus of whom Zonaras relates that he set on fire the fleet of Vitalian, who was in arms against Anastasius, by means of mirrors. According to other accounts, the fire was set by sulphur and not by mirrors. (This story has sometimes been erroneously referred to Proclus Diadochus.)
