= Decia gens =

Ancient Roman family

The gens Decia was a plebeian family of high antiquity, which became illustrious in Roman history by the example of its members sacrificing themselves for the preservation of their country. The first of the family known to history was Marcus Decius, chosen as a representative of the plebeians during the secession of 495 BC.

== Origin ==
Decius is the Latin form of the Oscan praenomen Dekis, or its gentile equivalent, Dekiis. The praenomen itself is the Oscan equivalent of the Latin name Decimus, and thus the nomen Decius is cognate with the Latin Decimius. From this it may be supposed that the Decii were of Oscan extraction, perhaps arising from the Sabine portion of Rome's original inhabitants. In any event, they were already at Rome in the earliest years of the Republic, as one of them was chosen to represent the plebeians during the first secession in 495 BC.

== Praenomina ==
The praenomina associated with the Decii are Marcus, Publius, and Quintus, of which Publius is the most famous, due to its association with the two consuls who devoted themselves to obtain victory for the soldiers under their command.

== Branches and cognomina ==
The only cognomina that occur among the Decii of the Republic are Mus and Subulo. Mus, or "mouse", was the name of a family that was renowned in early Roman history for two of its members devoting themselves to death in order to save the Republic.

== Members ==
This list includes abbreviated praenomina. For an explanation of this practice, see filiation.

- Marcus Decius, one of the deputies sent to the Senate by the plebeians during their secession to the mons sacer in 494 BC. He was tribune of the plebs in 491.
- Marcus Decius, tribune of the plebs in 311 BC, carried a plebiscitum, that the people should appoint duumviri navales to restore and equip the Roman fleet.
- Publius Decius Subulo, one of the triumvirs for settling new colonists at Aquileia in 169 BC. He is probably the same person as the legate of 168.
- Publius Decius, one of the legates who in BC 168 brought the news of the defeat of the Illyrians and the capture of their king, Gentius, to Rome.
- Publius Decius, tribune of the people in 120 BC, brought Lucius Opimius to trial for having caused the murder of Gaius Gracchus, and for having thrown citizens into prison without a judicial verdict. In 115, Decius was praetor urbanus, when he refused to rise for the consul, Marcus Aemilius Scaurus, who had induced Opimius to take up arms against Gracchus. The consul tore Decius' gown, broke his chair to pieces, and ordered that no-one should receive justice at the hands of the praetor. Cicero describes Decius as an orator who emulated Marcus Fulvius Flaccus, the friend of Gracchus, and was as turbulent in his speeches as he was in life.
- Publius Decius, a colleague of Marcus Antonius, who was taken prisoner at Mutina, but afterward allowed by Octavian to return to his friend. Cicero writes that he endeavoured to follow the example of his ancestors by sacrificing himself to his debts (by accompanying Antonius, through whose influence he hoped to rid himself of debt).
- Decius, proscribed by the Second Triumvirate, took to flight, but while hurrying out of the gates of Rome, was recognized by the centurions and put to death.
- Decius, the sculptor of a colossal head in the Capitol, may have lived in the first century BC. Pliny writes that, although much admired in itself, Decius' work was put to shame by another made by Chares of Lindos, sculptor of the Colossus of Rhodes, which was brought to Rome by the consul Publius Cornelius Lentulus Spinther in 57 BC.

=== Decii Mures ===
- Quintus Decius Mus, the father of Publius Decius Mus, consul in 340 BC.
- Publius Decius Q. f. Mus, consul in 340 BC, during the Latin War. Following a vision that appeared to him and his colleague, when his wing of the army began to waver, he devoted himself and the enemy's army to the gods of death before the Pontifex Maximus, before plunging into the thick of battle, where he was slain, even as the Romans gained the victory.
- Publius Decius P. f. Q. n. Mus, consul in 312, 308, 297, and 295 BC, magister equitum in 306, censor in 304. At the Battle of Sentinum in 295, his troops began to give way under the terrible attacks of the Gauls, so Decius, emulating his father, dedicated himself and the army of the enemy to the gods of the dead, sacrificing himself for his country.
- Publius Decius P. f. P. n. Mus, consul in 279 BC, when he fought against Pyrrhus of Epirus at the Battle of Asculum. According to Cicero, he followed the example of his father and grandfather, and devoted himself; but according to other sources, Pyrrhus, forewarned of the deeds of the consul's father and grandfather, ordered that Decius should be taken alive, and gained the victory.

=== Later Decii ===
- Gaius Messius Quintus Decius Valerinus (Traianus Decius), Roman emperor from AD 249 to 251.
- Caecina Decius Albinus, praefectus urbi of Rome in AD 402.
- Caecina Decius Acinatius Albinus, praefectus urbi of Rome in AD 414.
- Albinus, praefectus urbi of Rome in AD 426, consul in 444, and praetorian prefect of Italy from 443 to 449. Possibly identical to Acinatius Albinus.
- Caecina Decius Basilius, consul in 463 and twice praetorian prefect of Italy.
- Caecina Decius Maximus Basilius, consul in AD 480 and praetorian prefect of Italy in 483.
- Decius Marius Venantius Basilius, praefectus urbi and consul in 484.
- Caecina Mavortius Basilius Decius, consul in AD 486.
- Caecina Decius Faustus Albinus, son of Maximus Basilius, was consul in 493 and praetorian prefect of Italy around 500.
- Decius, consul sine collega in AD 529.
- Decius Paulinus, the last consul from the Roman Senate, appointed in 534.
- Decius, first Exarch of Ravenna, from AD 584 to 585.

== See also ==
- List of Roman gentes

== Bibliography ==
- Marcus Tullius Cicero, De Finibus Bonorum et Malorum, De Oratore, Philippicae, Tusculanae Quaestiones.
- Dionysius of Halicarnassus, Romaike Archaiologia (Roman Antiquities).
- Titus Livius (Livy), History of Rome.
- Gaius Plinius Secundus (Pliny the Elder), Historia Naturalis (Natural History).
- Appianus Alexandrinus (Appian), Bellum Civile (The Civil War).
- Lucius Cassius Dio Cocceianus (Cassius Dio), Roman History.
- Sextus Aurelius Victor, De Viris Illustribus (On Famous Men).
- Joannes Zonaras, Epitome Historiarum (Epitome of History).
- Dictionary of Greek and Roman Biography and Mythology, William Smith, ed., Little, Brown and Company, Boston (1849).
- George Davis Chase, "The Origin of Roman Praenomina", in Harvard Studies in Classical Philology, vol. VIII, pp. 103–184 (1897).
- T. Robert S. Broughton, The Magistrates of the Roman Republic, American Philological Association (1952–1986).
