= Symmachus (consul 522) =

Flavius Symmachus (fl. 522–526) was a Roman politician during the Ostrogothic kingdom in Italy.

He was the son of the philosopher Anicius Manlius Severinus Boethius and of Rusticiana (his aunts were Galla and Proba), and the brother of Boethius. Symmachus shared the consulate with Boethius, a position chosen by the Ostrogothic court.

His father fell into disgrace with the Ostrogothic ruler, resulting in the confiscation of his property. Following the death of King Theodoric the Great in 526, these properties were returned to Boethius and Symmachus.

== Bibliography ==
- CIL X, 4496 CIL V, 5430 CIL VI, 9162 CIL VI, 32043 CIL IX, 2074 CIL XII, 2309 CIL XII, 2404 AE 1961, 284 CIL XII, 933
- Martindale, John R., ed. (1980). "Fl. Symmachus 8". The Prosopography of the Later Roman Empire: Volume II, AD 395–527. Cambridge: Cambridge University Press. p. 1044. ISBN 0-521-20159-4.

Political offices
Preceded by Flavius Petrus Sabbatius Iustinianus, Flavius Valerius	Consul of the Roman Empire; 522 with Boethius	Succeeded by Anicius Maximus
