= Theodorus Filoxenus Sotericus Filoxenus =

Eastern consul

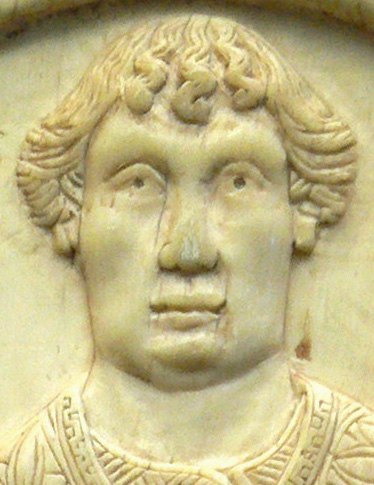
Diptych of Theodorus

Flavius Theodorus Filoxenus Sotericus Filoxenus was the consul of the Eastern Roman Empire in 525 CE. He was consul while Probus was Western consul.

Theodorus Filoxenus was the son of Sotericus Filoxenus.

A diptych from when he was consul, refers to him with "Flavius Theodorus Filoxenus, son of Sotericus Filoxenus, with the rank of illustris, domestic count, formerly master in Thrace, and ordinary consul."

Political offices
Preceded by Justin I, Venantius Opilio	Roman consul 525 with Probus	Succeeded by Olybrius
