= Urbicius (eunuch) =

Urbicius (Greek: Οὐρβίκιος, romanized: Ourbikios; died before 518) was imperial chamberlain (praepositus sacri cubiculi), an office only held by eunuchs, to several Byzantine emperors of the 5th century. He lived to an advanced age, and held great political influence at the Byzantine court during the later 5th century.

He is first recorded as holding the office in 434, under Theodosius II, and he retained the same position under Leo I the Thracian. After the death of Leo in 474, Urbicius at first supported the usurper Basiliscus, but eventually switched allegiance to and Zeno. In 491, Urbicius supported the election of Anastasius I Dicorus. The latest reference to Urbicius dates to 504/5. De Situ Terrae Sanctae, written before 530, reports that he died during the reign of Anastasius (r. 491–518), and that "the earth would not keep him", claiming he was ejected from his grave three times, in connection with the removal of part of the holy rock known as "the Seat of Mary" under his orders.
