= Praepositus sacri cubiculi =

The praepositus sacri cubiculi (Latin: "provost of the sacred bedchamber", in Greek: πραιπόσιτος τοῦ εὐσεβεστάτου κοιτῶνος, romanized: praipositos tou eusebestatou koitōnos) was one of the senior palace offices in the Late Roman Empire. Its holder was usually a eunuch, and acted as the grand chamberlain of the palace, wielding considerable authority and influence. In the 7th or 8th century, the title was also given to an order of rank for eunuch palace servants. The title and office continued in use in the simplified form of praipositos (πραιπόσιτος) in the Byzantine Empire until the late 11th century.

== History and evolution ==
The first securely identifiable holder of the office was Eusebius under Emperor Constantius II (r. 337–361), but the position may have been introduced already under Constantine the Great (r. 306–337), in replacement of the older a cubiculo. He controlled the corps of the cubicularii (κουβικουλάριοι, koubikoularioi), also eunuchs, and was responsible for the imperial bedchamber, wardrobe and receptions.

Originally under the control of the castrensis sacri palatii, he soon became directly subordinated to the Byzantine emperor. His proximity to the Byzantine emperor gave him great power, and several praepositi wielded considerable influence in the governance of the Byzantine Empire. In the Notitia Dignitatum, the praepositus is listed immediately after the praetorian prefects, the urban prefect and the magistri militum. However, due to the loss of the relevant pages of the Notitia, we do not know the structure of his officium. Senior assistants were the primicerius sacri cubiculi and the comes sacrae vestis.

During the 4th-5th centuries, the praepositus gained in power: in the late 4th century, he gained control over the imperial estates of Cappadocia (the domus divina per Cappadociam of the Notitia), and was elevated in rank to vir illustris and the equivalent of quaestor. A separate praepositus was also established for the household of the Byzantine empress (praepositus Augustae), with a similar structure of subordinate officials. In the Western Roman Empire, the post continued in existence until its fall, and was also used in the court of the Ostrogoth king Theodoric the Great, where it was held by a Goth, Triwila. In the mid-6th century, however, the supervision of the Cappadocian estates was entrusted to a separate official in charge of the imperial patrimony, and its authority declined.

In the 7th-8th centuries, paralleling changes in many other administrative offices, the position of praepositus, or praipositos in Greek, was much reduced in power, as parts of his officium were split off. The cubicularii of the bedchamber (distinguished as κοιτωνῖται, koitōnitai in Greek) were separated under the parakoimōmenos, while the imperial wardrobe (Latin: vestiarium, Greek: [βασιλικὸν] βεστιάριον, [basilikon] vestiarion) under its head, the prōtovestiarios, was also made into a separate department. The praipositos continued to supervise the remainder of the koubikoularioi, with the primikērios tou kouboukleiou as his chief aide. He retained a considerable role in court ceremonies, and ranked in the higher class of the patrikioi. According to Constantine VII (r. 913–959), the praipositos, together with the prōtomagistros and the eparch of Constantinople used to form a regency in the emperor's absence.

The continuing actual office of praipositos, however, is not to be confused with the dignity (διὰ βραβείου ἀξία, dia brabeiou axia) of the same name, which was a court rank created in the 7th or 8th century and restricted to eunuchs. According to Philotheos's Klētorologion of 899, it ranked below the dignity of patrikios and above that of prōtospatharios, and the insignia (brabeion) of the office were ivory tablets. The title is last attested in 1087.

== Notable praepositi ==
- Eusebius (337–361)
- Eutherius (356–360)
- Eutropius (East, circa 395–399)
- Deuterius (West, 408)
- Terentius (West, 408–409)
- Eusebius (West, 409)
- Lausus (East, 420)
- Chrysaphius (East, 443–450)
- Lauricius (West, 443–444)
- Faustus (Anicius Acilius Aginantius Faustus?) (Ostrogothic Italy, under Theoderic)
- Triwila (Ostrogothic Italy, early 520s)
- Urbicius (East, 470–481 and 491)
- Amantius (East, 518)
- Narses (East, 537/538–554 or 558/559)

== Sources ==
- Bury, J. B. (1911). The Imperial Administrative System of the Ninth Century – With a Revised Text of the Kletorologion of Philotheos. London: Oxford University Press. OCLC 1046639111.
- Holum, Kenneth G. (1982). Theodosian Empresses: Women and Imperial Dominion in Late Antiquity. The Transformation of the Classical Heritage 3. Berkeley: University of California Press.
- Martindale, John R., ed. (1980). The Prosopography of the Later Roman Empire: Volume II, AD 395–527. Cambridge: Cambridge University Press. ISBN 0-521-20159-4.
- Martindale, John R., ed. (1992). The Prosopography of the Later Roman Empire: Volume III, AD 527–641. Cambridge: Cambridge University Press. ISBN 0-521-20160-8.
- Kazhdan, Alexander (1991). "Praepositus sacri cubiculi". In Kazhdan, Alexander (ed.). The Oxford Dictionary of Byzantium. Oxford and New York: Oxford University Press. p. 1709. ISBN 0-19-504652-8.
