= Maximus (consul 523) =

Roman senator

(Anicius) Maximus (died 552) was a Roman senator and patrician during the Ostrogothic kingdom, who celebrated the last games in the Colosseum.

== Biography ==
Maximus was a descendant of Roman emperor Petronius Maximus, and of the noble Anicii. His father was Volusianus, consul in 503, and he had a brother called Marcianus and an uncle called Liberius. Maximus married for the first time in 510, then obtained, at a young age, the consulate in the West sine collega for the year 523. On that occasion he received King Theodoric's permission to celebrate the event with venationes in the Colosseum, the last games ever held there, but later the king complained about the waste of money these entailed.

Between 525 and 535, he was elevated to the rank of patricius; King Theodahad gave him an Ostrogothic princess as wife in 535, appointed him primicerius domesticorum and gave him the property of Marcianus, which later Justinian I had him split with Liberius.

In 537, during the Siege of Rome in the Gothic War, Maximus was expelled from the city along with other senators at the behest of Belisarius, who was afraid that they would collaborate with the Gothic besiegers, only to return at the end of the siege in 538. On 17 December 546, however, King Totila was able to take the Urbs, and Maximus and other patricii hid in Old St. Peter's Basilica. Captured and sent to Campania, he was still there when, in 552, Narses conquered Rome; the senators were preparing to return to Rome, but the Goths who guarded them, enraged by the death of Totila, killed them all.

== Bibliography ==
=== Primary sources ===
- CIL X, 1348; CIL V, 5737; CIL V, 6264; CIL X, 1348; CIL XI, 308; CIL XII, 1781; CIL XIII, 2378; AE 1947, 78;
- Cassiodorus, Variae, V.42, X,11-12
- Procopius, Bellum Gothicus, 1.25.14-15, 3.20.18-19, 4.34.6

=== Secondary sources ===
- Sundwall, Johannes (1975) [1919]. Abhandlungen zur Geschichte des ausgehenden Römertums. New York. pp. 140f. ISBN 9780405070655.
- Martindale, John R., ed. (1980). The Prosopography of the Later Roman Empire: Volume II, AD 395–527. Cambridge: Cambridge University Press. ISBN 0-521-20159-4.
- Mommaerts, T. S.; Kelley, D. H. (2002) [1992]. "The Anicii of Gaul and Rome". In Drinkwater, John; Elton, Hugh (eds.). Fifth-Century Gaul: A Crisis of Identity?. Cambridge University Press. pp. 111–121. ISBN 978-0-521-52933-4.

Political offices
Preceded by Symmachus; Boethius	Roman consul 523	Succeeded by Justin Augustus; Venantius Opilio
