= Roman consul =

Political office in ancient Rome

The consuls were the two highest elected public officials of the Roman Republic (c. 509 BC to 27 BC). Romans considered the consulship the second-highest level of the cursus honorum—an ascending sequence of public offices to which politicians aspired—after that of the censor, which was reserved for former consuls. Each year, the centuriate assembly elected two consuls to serve jointly for a one-year term. The consuls alternated each month holding fasces (taking turns leading) when both were in Rome. A consul's imperium (military power) extended over Rome and all its provinces.

Having two consuls created a check on the power of any one individual, in accordance with the republican belief that the powers of the former kings of Rome should be spread out into multiple offices. To that end, each consul could veto the actions of the other consul.

After the establishment of the Empire (27 BC), the consuls became mere symbolic representatives of Rome's republican heritage and held very little power and authority, with the Emperor acting as the supreme authority.

== History ==
=== Under the Republic ===
According to Roman tradition, after the expulsion of the last king, Tarquinius Superbus, the powers and authority of the king were given to the newly instituted consulship. Originally, consuls were called praetors ("leaders"), referring to their duties as the chief military commanders. By at least 300 BC the title of consul became commonly used. Ancient writers usually derive the title consul from the Latin verb consulere, "to take counsel", but this is most likely a later gloss of the term, which probably derives—in view of the joint nature of the office—from con- and sal-, "get together" or from con- and sell-/sedl-, "sit down together with" or "next to". In Greek, the title was originally rendered as στρατηγὸς ὕπατος, strategos hypatos ("the supreme general"), and later simply as ὕπατος (hypatos).

The consulship was believed by the Romans to date back to the traditional establishment of the Republic in 509 BC, but the succession of consuls was not continuous in the 5th century BC, when the consulship was supposedly replaced with a board of consular tribunes, which was elected whenever the military needs of the state were significant enough to warrant the election of more than the usual two consuls. These remained in place until the office was abolished in 367 BC and the consulship was reintroduced.

Consuls had extensive powers in peacetime (administrative, legislative, and judicial), and in wartime often held the highest military command. Additional religious duties included certain rites which, as a sign of their formal importance, could only be carried out by the highest state officials. Consuls also read auguries, an essential religious ritual, before leading armies into the field.

Two consuls were elected each year, serving together, each with veto power over the other's actions, a normal principle for magistracies. They were elected by the comitia centuriata, which also elected praetors and censors. However, they formally assumed powers only after the ratification of their election in the older comitia curiata, which granted the consuls their imperium by enacting a law, the lex curiata de imperio.

If a consul died during his term (not uncommon when consuls were in the forefront of battle) or was removed from office, another would be elected by the comitia centuriata to serve the remainder of the term as consul suffectus (suffect consul). A consul elected to start the year, called a consul ordinarius (ordinary consul), held more prestige than a suffect consul, partly because the year would be named for ordinary consuls (see consular dating).

According to tradition, the consulship was initially reserved for patricians and only in 367 BC did plebeians win the right to stand for this supreme office, when the Licinio-Sextian rogations provided that at least one consul each year should be plebeian. The first plebeian consul, Lucius Sextius, was elected the following year. Nevertheless, the office remained largely in the hands of a few families, as only about fifteen novi homines ("new men" with no consular background) were elected to the consulship until the election of Cicero in 63 BC. Modern historians have questioned the traditional account of plebeian emancipation during the early Republic (see Conflict of the Orders), noting for instance that about thirty percent of the consuls prior to Sextius had plebeian, not patrician, names. It is possible that only the chronology has been distorted, but it seems that one of the first consuls, Lucius Junius Brutus, came from a plebeian family. Another possible explanation is that during the 5th-century social struggles, the office of consul was gradually monopolized by a patrician elite.

During times of war, the primary qualification for consul was military skill and reputation, but at all times the selection was politically charged. With the passage of time, the consulship became the normal endpoint of the cursus honorum, the sequence of offices pursued by the Roman who chose to pursue a political career. When Lucius Cornelius Sulla regulated the cursus by law, the minimum age of election to consul became 43 or 42 years old. This age requirement was later changed to 32 during the Empire.

=== Under the Empire ===
Although throughout the early years of the Principate the consuls were still formally elected by the comitia centuriata, they were de facto nominated by the princeps. As the years progressed, the distinction between the comitia centuriata and the comitia populi tributa (which elected the lower magisterial positions) appears to have disappeared, and so for the purposes of the consular elections, there came to be just a single "assembly of the people" which elected all the magisterial positions of the state, while the consuls continued to be nominated by the princeps.

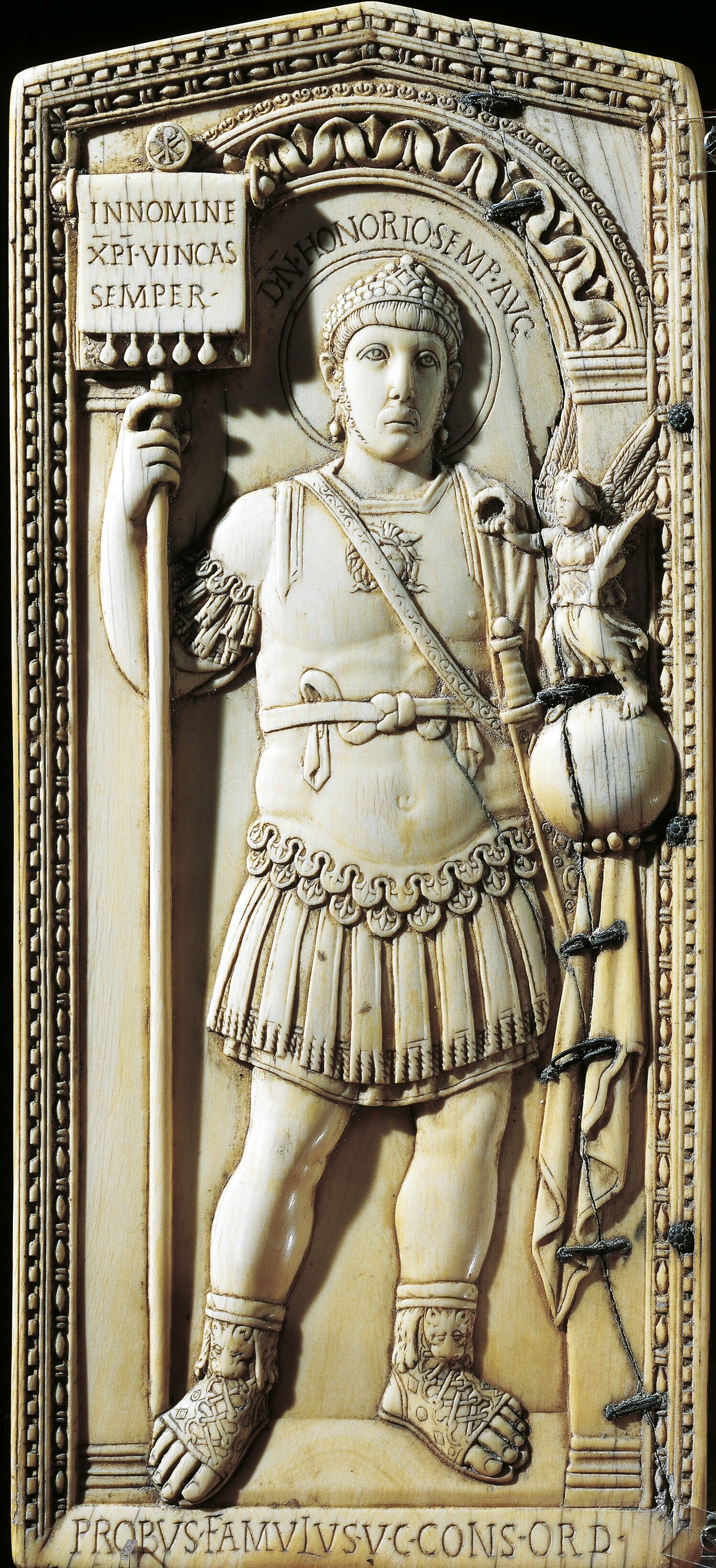
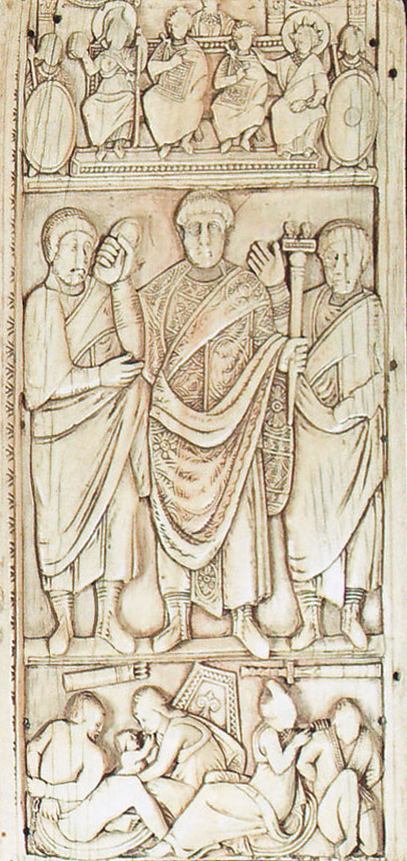
On the left: Emperor Honorius on the consular diptych of Probus (406)
On the right: Consular diptych of Constantius III (a co-emperor with Honorius in 421), produced for his consulate of the Western Roman Empire in 413 or 417

The imperial consulate during the Principate (until the 3rd century) was an important position, albeit as the method through which the Roman aristocracy could progress through to the higher levels of imperial administration—only former consuls could become consular legates, the proconsuls of Africa and Asia, or the urban prefect of Rome. It was a post that would be occupied by a man halfway through his career, in his early thirties for a patrician, or in his early forties for most others. Emperors frequently appointed themselves, or their protégés or relatives, as consuls, even without regard to the age requirements. Caligula once said that he would appoint his horse Incitatus consul, which was probably a joke intended to belittle the Senate's authority.

The need for a pool of men to fill the consular positions forced Augustus to remodel the suffect consulate, allowing more than the two elected for the ordinary consulate. During the reigns of the Julio-Claudians, the ordinary consuls who began the year usually relinquished their office mid-year, with the election for the suffect consuls occurring at the same time as that for the ordinary consuls. During reigns of the Flavian and Antonine emperors, the ordinary consuls tended to resign after a period of four months, and the elections were moved to 12 January of the year in which they were to hold office. Election of the consuls were transferred to the Senate during the Flavian or Antonine periods, although through to the 3rd century, the people were still called on to ratify the Senate's selections. The emperor did not assume the consulship of every year of his reign, but did nominate himself multiple times; Augustus was consul 13 times, Domitian 17, and Theodosius II 18.

The proliferation of suffect consuls through this process, and the allocation of this office to homines novi tended, over time, to devalue the office. However, the high regard placed upon the ordinary consulate remained intact; it was one of the few offices that one could share with the emperor, and during this period it was filled mostly by patricians or by individuals who had consular ancestors. If they were especially skilled or valued, they may even have achieved a second (or rarely, a third) consulate. Prior to achieving the consulate, these individuals already had a significant career behind them and would expect to continue serving the state, filling in the post upon which the state functioned. Consequently, holding the ordinary consulship was a great honor, and the office was the major symbol of the still relatively republican constitution. Probably as part of seeking formal legitimacy, the break-away Gallic Empire had its own pairs of consuls during its existence (260–274). The list of consuls for this state is incomplete, drawn from inscriptions and coins.

By the end of the 3rd century, much had changed. The loss of many pre-consular functions, and the gradual encroachment of the equites into the traditional senatorial administrative and military functions, meant that senatorial careers virtually vanished prior to their appointment as consuls. This saw a suffect consulship granted at an earlier age, to the point that by the 4th century, it was being held by men in their early twenties, and possibly younger, without the significant political careers behind them that was normal previously. As time progressed, second consulates, usually ordinary, became far more common than during the first two centuries, whereas the first consulship was usually a suffect consulate. The consulate during this period was no longer just the province of senators—the automatic awarding of a suffect consulship to the equestrian praetorian prefects (who were given the ornamenta consularia upon achieving their office) allowed them to style themselves cos. II when they were later granted an ordinary consulship by the emperor. All this had the effect of further devaluing the office of consul to the point that by the final years of the 3rd century, holding an ordinary consulate was occasionally left out of the cursus inscriptions, whereas by the first decades of the 4th century, suffect consulships were hardly ever recorded.

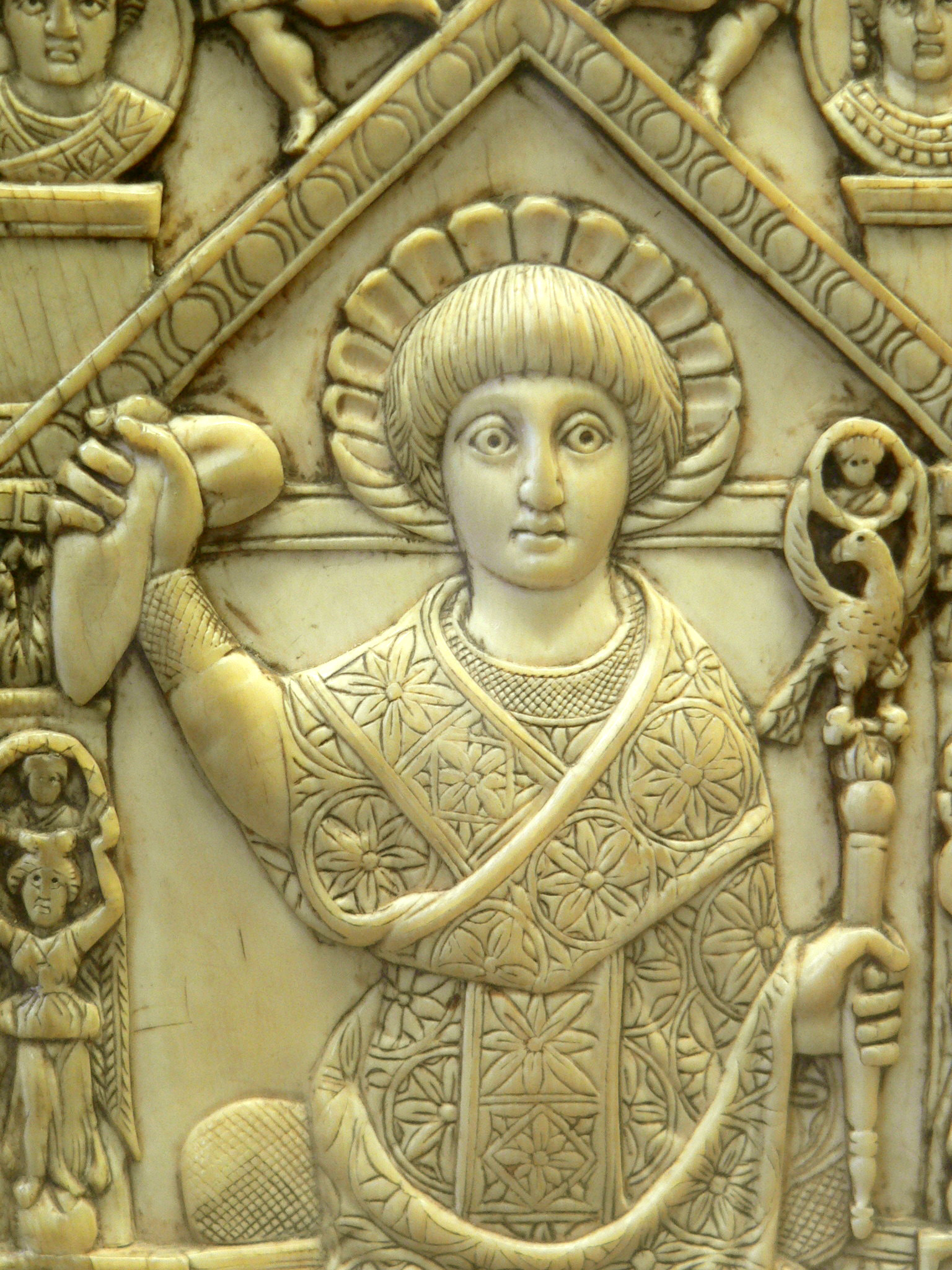
Anastasius (consul of the Eastern Roman Empire for AD 517) in consular garb, holding a sceptre and the mappa, a piece of cloth used to signal the start of chariot races at the Hippodrome. Ivory panel diptych.

One of the reforms of Constantine I (r. 306–337) was to assign one of the consuls to the city of Rome and the other to Constantinople. Therefore, when the Empire was divided into two on the death of Theodosius I (r. 379–395), the emperor of each half acquired the right of appointing one of the consuls—although on occasion an emperor did allow his colleague to appoint both consuls for various reasons. In the Western Empire, some Eastern consuls were never recognized by the emperor, who became a puppet of powerful generals such as Stilicho. The consulship, bereft of any real power, continued to be a great honor, but the celebrations attending it—above all the chariot races—had come to involve considerable expense; part of the expense had to be covered by the state. At times the consulship was given to teenagers or even children, as in the cases of Varronianus, Valentinianus Galates, Olybrius Junior and the children of the emperor.

In the 6th century, the consulship was increasingly sparsely given, until it was allowed to lapse under Justinian I (r. 527–565): the western consulship lapsed in 534, with Decius Paulinus the last holder, and the consulship of the East in 541, with Anicius Faustus Albinus Basilius. Consular dating had already been abolished in 537, when Justinian introduced dating by the emperor's regnal year and the indiction. In the eastern court, the appointment to consulship became a part of the rite of proclamation of a new emperor from Justin II (r. 565–578) on, and is last attested in the proclamation of the future Constans II (r. 641–668) as consul in 632. In the late 9th century, Emperor Leo the Wise (r. 886–912) finally abolished the office in Novel 94 of his Basilika. By that time, the Greek titles for consul and ex-consul, "hypatos" and "apo hypaton", had been transformed to relatively lowly honorary dignities.

In the west, the rank of consul was occasionally bestowed upon individuals by the Papacy. In 719, the title of Roman consul was offered by the Pope to Charles Martel, although Martel refused it. About 853, Alfred the Great, then a child aged four or five, was made a Roman consul by the Pope.

== Powers and responsibilities ==
=== Republican duties ===
Traditionally, after the expulsion of the kings, all the powers that had belonged to the kings were transferred to two offices: the consulship and the office of rex sacrorum. While the rex sacrorum inherited the kings' position as royal priest and various religious functions were handed off to the pontiffs, the consuls were given the remaining civil and military responsibilities. To prevent abuse of the kingly power, this authority was shared by two consuls, each of whom could veto the other's actions, with short annual terms.

The consuls were invested with the executive power of the state and headed the government of the Republic. Initially, the consuls held vast executive and judicial power. In the gradual development of the Roman legal system, however, some important functions were detached from the consulship and assigned to new officers. Thus, in 443 BC, the responsibility to conduct the Census was taken from the consuls and given to the censors. The second function taken from the consulship was their judicial power. Their position as chief judges was transferred to the praetors in 366 BC. After this time, the consul would only serve as judges in extraordinary criminal cases and only when called upon by decree of the Senate.

==== Civil sphere ====
For the most part, power was divided between civil and military spheres. As long as the consuls were in the pomerium (the city of Rome), they were at the head of government, and all the other magistrates, with the exception of the tribune of the plebs, were subordinate to them, but retained independence of office. The internal machinery of the Republic was under the consuls' supervision. In order to allow the consuls greater authority in executing laws, the consuls had the right of summons and arrest, which was limited only by the right of appeal from their judgement. This power of punishment even extended to inferior magistrates.

As part of their executive functions, the consuls were responsible for carrying into effect the decrees of the Senate and the laws of the assemblies. Sometimes, in great emergencies, they might act on their own authority and responsibility. The consuls also served as the chief diplomats of the Roman state. Before any foreign ambassadors reached the Senate, they met with the consuls. The consul would introduce ambassadors to the Senate, and they alone negotiated between the Senate and foreign states.

The consuls could convene the Senate, and presided over its meetings. The consuls served as president of the Senate, one at a time, alternating every month. They could also summon any of the three Roman assemblies (Curiate, Centuriate, and Tribal) and presided over them. Thus, the consuls conducted the elections and put legislative measures to the vote. When neither consul was within the city, their civic duties were assumed by the praetor urbanus.

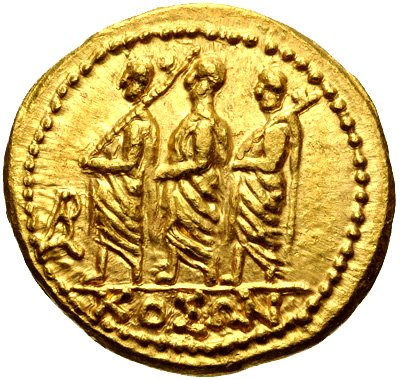
Gold coin from Dacia, minted by Coson, depicting a consul and two lictors

Each consul was accompanied in every public appearance by twelve lictors, who displayed the magnificence of the office and served as his bodyguards. Each lictor held a fasces, a bundle of rods that contained an axe. The fasces symbolized the military power, or imperium. When inside the pomerium, the lictors removed the axes from the fasces to show that a citizen could not be executed without a trial. Upon entering the comitia centuriata, the lictors would lower the fasces to show that the powers of the consuls derive from the people.

==== Military sphere ====
Outside the walls of Rome, the powers of the consuls were far more extensive in their role as commanders-in-chief of all Roman legions. It was in this function that the consuls were vested with full imperium. When legions were ordered by a decree of the Senate, the consuls conducted the levy in the Campus Martius. Upon entering the army, all soldiers had to take their oath of allegiance to the consuls. The consuls also oversaw the gathering of troops provided by Rome's allies.

Within the city a consul could punish and arrest a citizen, but had no power to inflict capital punishment. When on campaign, however, a consul could inflict any punishment he saw fit on any soldier, officer, citizen, or ally.

Each consul commanded an army, usually two legions strong, with the help of military tribunes and a quaestor who had financial duties. In the rare case that both consuls marched together, each one held the command for a day respectively. A typical consular army was about 20,000 men and consisted of two citizen and two allied legions. In the early years of the Republic, Rome's enemies were located in central Italy, so campaigns lasted a few months. As Rome's frontiers expanded, in the 2nd century BC, the campaigns became more lengthy. Rome was a warlike society and very seldom did not wage war. So the consul upon entering office was expected by the Senate and the People to march his army against Rome's enemies, and expand the Roman frontiers. His soldiers expected to return to their homes after the campaign with spoils. If the consul won an overwhelming victory, he was hailed as imperator by his troops, and could request to be granted a triumph.

The consul could conduct the campaign as he saw fit, and had unlimited powers. However, after the campaign, he could be prosecuted for his misdeeds (for example for abusing the provinces, or wasting public money, as Scipio Africanus was accused by Cato in 205 BC).

==== Abuse prevention ====
Abuse of power by consuls was prevented with each consul given the power to veto his colleague consul. Therefore, except in the provinces as commanders-in-chief where each consul's power was supreme, the consuls could only act not against each other's determined will. Against the sentence of one consul, an appeal could be brought before his colleague, which, if successful, would see the sentence overturned. In order to avoid unnecessary conflicts, only one consul would actually perform the office's duties every month and could act without direct interference. In the next month, the consuls would switch roles with one another. This would continue until the end of the consular term. Another point which acted as a check against consuls was the certainty that after the end of their term they would be called to account for their actions while in office. There were also three other restrictions on consular power. Their term in office was short (one year); their duties were pre-decided by the Senate; and they could not stand again for election immediately after the end of their office. Usually a period of ten years was expected between consulships.

==== Governorship ====
After leaving office, the consuls were assigned by the Senate to a province to administer as governor. The provinces to which each consul was assigned were drawn by lot and determined before the end of his consulship. Transferring his consular imperium to proconsular imperium, the consul would become a proconsul and governor of one (or several) of Rome's many provinces. As a proconsul, his imperium was limited to only a specified province and not the entire Republic. Any exercise of proconsular imperium in any other province was illegal. Also, a proconsul was not allowed to leave his province before his term was complete or before the arrival of his successor. Exceptions were given only on special permission of the Senate. Most terms as governor lasted between one and five years.

==== Appointment of the dictator ====
In times of crisis, when Rome's territory was in immediate danger, a dictator was appointed by the consuls for a period of no more than six months, after the proposition of the Senate. While the dictator held office, the imperium of the consuls was subordinate to the dictator.

=== Imperial duties ===
After Augustus became the first Roman emperor in 27 BC with the establishment of the Principate, the consuls lost most of their powers and responsibilities. Though still officially the highest office of the state, they were merely a symbol of Rome's republican heritage. One of the two consular positions was often occupied by emperors themselves, especially from the 3rd century onwards. However, the imperial consuls maintained the right to preside at meetings of the Senate. They could also administer matters of justice, and organize games (ludi) and all public solemnities at their own expense.

== Consular dating ==
By the late republic, years were customarily assigned the names of the two consuls who took office that year. It is not clear when this custom started; scholars have suggested dates as late as 304 or c. 275 BC.

For example, the letter from Cicero to Atticus ends with a date, expressed in Latin with the ablative absolute as VI Kal. Febr. M. Messalla M. Pisone coss (meaning "six days before the Kalends of February, Marcus Messalla and Marcus Piso being consuls"). The date corresponds to 25 January 61 BC, since that was the year in which the two men were consuls. The date the consuls took office varied: from 222 BC to 153 BC they took office 15 March, and due to the Second Celtiberian War, from 153 BC onwards the consuls took office on 1 January. The practice of dating years ab urbe condita (from the supposed foundation date of Rome) was less frequently used.

Consular Dating Key

1. 509–479 BC: 1 September–29 August (August had only 29 days in Ancient Rome)
2. 478–451 BC: 1 August–31 July
3. 450–403 BC: 13 December–12 December
4. 402–393 BC: 1 October–29 September (September had 29 days)
5. 392–329 BC: 1 July–29 June (29 days)
6. 328-223 BC: 1 May-29 April (29 days)
7. 222–154 BC: 15 March–14 March
8. 153–46 BC: 1 January–29 December (29 days)

== Epigraphy ==
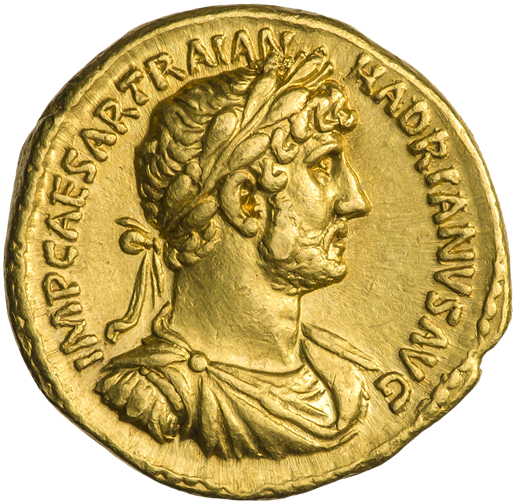
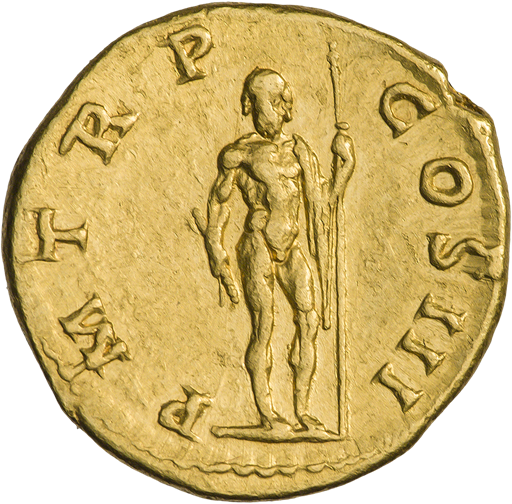
An aureus commemorating the third consulate ("COS III") of the emperor Hadrian (AD 119)

In Roman inscriptions, the word consul was usually abbreviated cos. The disappearance of the ⟨N⟩ was based on the classical Latin pronunciation of the word as /kõːsul/ or [ko:sul] since an /n/ sound before a fricative was omitted or solely nasalized the previous vowel instead. The word was sometimes spelled cosol in antiquity. Particularly in the imperial era, additional consulships after the first were noted by a trailing Roman numeral: twice consul was abbreviated cos ii, thrice consul cos iii, four times consul cos iiii or iv, etc.

== Lists of Roman consuls ==
For a complete list of Roman consuls, see:

- List of Roman consuls
- List of undated Roman consuls
- List of consuls designate

== See also ==
- Constitution of the Roman Republic
- French Consulate – Government of France from 1799 to 1804
- Consul (Gallic Empire)
- Captains Regent – The two Heads of State in San Marino.
