= 550s =

Decade

The 550s decade ran from January 1, 550, to December 31, 559.

== Events ==
=== By place ===
==== Byzantine Empire ====
- Emperor Justinian I appoints Bessas commander (magister militum) of Armenia, and entrusts him with the war in Lazica (Georgia).
  - Siege of Petra (550–551)
- January 16 – Gothic War: The Ostrogoths under king Totila recapture Rome after a long siege, by bribing the Isaurian garrison.
- Summer – Totila plunders Sicily, after he subdues Corsica and Sardinia. He sends a Gothic fleet to raid the coasts of Greece.
- Justinian I sends two Nestorian monks on a mission to Central Asia, to spread Christianity in the East (approximate date).

==== Europe ====
- The Vendel era begins; the name is given to a region in Uppland (an important area of the sagas' account of a Swedish kingdom).

==== Persia ====
- The Sassanid Empire, under the reign of King Khosrow I, controls the trade of silk destined for Europe and the Byzantine Empire.

==== Asia ====
- The Eastern Wei Dynasty ends, and Wen Xuan Di becomes emperor of Northern Qi. He forces Xiao Jing Di to yield the throne.
- Wen Xuan Di adopts a defensive policy towards the hostile northern tribes; he builds over 1,000 miles of walls on the border.
- The Gupta Empire falls; India is again ruled by regional kingdoms (approximate date).

==== Americas ====
- Construction of Quiriguá (Guatemala) begins (approximate date).
- The last known eruption of Chimborazo (modern Ecuador) occurs.

=== By topic ===
==== Arts and sciences ====
- Hindu mathematicians give zero a numeral representation in a positional notation system.
- Procopius writes the Secret History (approximate date).

==== Religion ====
- The churches of Lazica (Georgia) and Armenia split. While the Armenian Church remains independent, the Georgian church unites with the Byzantine Empire. This ecclesiastical union deepens political and cultural contact between the two states. As a sign of Lazica's status vis-à-vis Byzantium, Lazic princes are vested with honorific titles of the Byzantine court, including kouropalates, or "minister of the imperial palace" (approximate date).
- The main redaction of the Babylonian Talmud is completed under Rabbis Ravina and Ashi (approximate date).
- Chararic, king of the Suevi, converts to Catholicism.
- In Ireland, the Diocese of Tuam is erected.

=== By place ===
==== Byzantine Empire ====
- After the death of his cousin Germanus, Justinian I appoints Narses new supreme commander, and returns to Italy. In Salona on the Adriatic coast, he assembles a Byzantine expeditionary force totaling 20,000 or possibly 30,000 men and a contingent of foreign allies, notably Lombards, Heruls and Bulgars.
- Gothic War: Narses arrives in Venetia and discovers that a powerful Gothic-Frank army (50,000 men), under joint command of the kings Totila and Theudebald, has blocked the principal route to the Po Valley. Not wishing to engage such a formidable force and confident that the Franks would avoid a direct confrontation, Narses skirts the lagoons along the Adriatic shore, by using vessels to leapfrog his army from point to point along the coast. In this way he arrives at the capital Ravenna without encountering any opposition. He attacks and crushes a small Gothic force at Ariminum (modern Rimini).
- Spring – The 551 Malian Gulf earthquake takes place in the vicinity of the Malian Gulf; it affects the cities of Echinus and Tarphe.
- July 9 – Beirut is destroyed by an earthquake and tsunami. Its epicenter has an estimated magnitude of about 7.2 or 7.6, and according to reports of Antoninus of Piacenza, Christian pilgrim, some 30,000 people are killed.
- Autumn – Battle of Sena Gallica: The Byzantine fleet (50 warships) destroys the Gothic naval force under Indulf near Sena Gallica (Senigallia), some 17 miles (27 km) north of Ancona. It marks the end of the Gothic supremacy in the Mediterranean Sea.

==== Europe ====
- Athanagild revolts against the Visigothic king Agila. Their armies meet at Seville (Andalusia), and Agila is defeated.
- 12,000 Kutrigurs appear in Europe led by Chinialus and others to assist the Gepids.

==== Persia ====
- Spring – Lazic War - Siege of Petra (550–551): The Byzantine army and their Sabir allies (some 6,000 men) under Bessas recapture the strategic Byzantine fortress of Petra, located on the coast of the Black Sea. He orders the city walls razed to the ground.

==== Asia ====
- Autumn – Xiao Dong, great-nephew of the rebellious general Hou Jing, succeeds Jianwen Di as emperor of the Liang Dynasty. Xiao Dong has no real power and Hou Jing controls the imperial government at the capital Jiankang.
- Bumin Qaghan, chieftain of the Göktürks, founds the Turkic Khaganate. He unites the local Turkic tribes and throws off the yoke of Rouran domination.

=== By topic ===
==== Arts and sciences ====
- Jordanes, Roman bureaucrat, publishes "The Origin and Deeds of the Goths" (approximate date).

=== 552 ===
- July 11 – The Armenian calendar is introduced.

=== By place ===
==== Byzantine Empire ====
- July 1 – Battle of Taginae: Narses crosses the Apennines with a Byzantine army (25,000 men). He is blocked by a Gothic force under King Totila near Taginae (Central Italy). In a narrow mountain valley, Narses deploys his army in a "crescent shaped" formation. He dismounts his Lombard and Heruli cavalry mercenaries, placing them as a phalanx in the center. On his left flank he sends out a mixed force of foot and horse archers to seize a dominant height. The Goths open the battle with a determined cavalry charge. Halted by enfilading fire from both sides, the attackers are thrown back in confusion on the infantry behind them. The Byzantine cataphracts (Clibanarii) sweep into the milling mass. More than 6,000 Goths, including Totila, are killed. The remnants flee, and Narses proceeds to Rome, where he captures the city after a brief siege.
- Emperor Justinian I dispatches a small Byzantine force (2,000 men) under Liberius to Hispania, according to the historian Jordanes. He conquers Cartagena and other cities on the southeastern coast.
- Justinian I receives the first silkworm eggs from two Nestorian monks at Constantinople. They were sent to Central Asia (see 550) and smuggled the precious eggs from China hidden in rods of bamboo.

==== Europe ====
- Battle of Asfeld: The Lombards under King Audoin defeat the Gepids.
- Cynric, king of Wessex, captures the fortress city of Old Sarum.
- The Roman Catholic Diocese of Meath is established in Ireland.
- Teia becomes the last king of the Ostrogoths in Italy.

==== Asia ====
- July 11 – First year of the Armenian calendar.
- Yuan Di succeeds Xiao Dong as emperor of the Liang dynasty.
- Bumin Qaghan dies; the new khagan is Issik Qaghan of the Turkic Empire.
- Buddhism in Japan is introduced, according to the Nihon Shoki.

=== By topic ===
==== Industry ====
- Smuggling of silkworm eggs into the Byzantine Empire by monks allows development of the Byzantine silk industry in the Empire.

==== Religion ====
- Eutychius becomes patriarch of Constantinople.

=== By place ===
==== Byzantine Empire ====
- Battle of Mons Lactarius: King Teia secretly marches to join forces with his brother Aligern in Campania, to relieve the siege of Cumae. Meanwhile at Mons Lactarius (modern Monti Lattari), Narses lays an ambush. The combined Gothic force is crushed in a hopeless last stand for two days (south of Naples), and Teia is killed in the fighting. Aligern escapes, but surrenders a few months later.
- The Ostrogothic Kingdom ends after 60 years of rule in Italy. The Goths are allowed to return to their homes in peace and (re)settle in modern-day Austria. Some 7,000 people retreat to Campsas (Southern Gaul), and resist with minimal help from the Franks against the Byzantines until 554.
- The Sassanid commander Mihr-Mihroe force the Byzantines to retreat from Telephis and later Ollaria. (See Battle of Telephis–Ollaria).

==== Europe ====
- Gothic War: Frankish invasion — Two Frankish-Alemanni dukes, brothers Lothair and Buccelin, cross the Alps from Germany with a force of 75,000 men, mostly Frankish infantry. In the Po Valley, they win an easy victory over a much smaller Byzantine force at Parma, and are joined by remnants of the Gothic armies, bringing the total strength of the invaders to about 90,000 men. Narses, gathering his forces as quickly as possible, marches north to harass the Franks, but is not strong enough to engage them in battle. In Samnium (Southern Italy) the brothers divide their forces: Lothaire goes down the east coast, then returns to the north, to winter in the Po Valley. Buccelin follows the west coast into Calabria, where he spends the winter — his army being seriously wasted by attrition and disease.

==== Asia ====
- King Seong of Baekje attacks the kingdoms of Goguryeo and Silla. However, under a secret agreement, Silla troops attack the exhausted Baekje army, and take possession of the entire Han River valley.
- In the Turkic Khaganate Istemi is appointed governor (yabgu) in the west of the empire (modern Turkestan), and Muqan Qaghan succeeds his brother Issik Qaghan as emperor (khagan) of the Göktürks.

=== By topic ===
==== Religion ====
- May 5 – The Fifth Ecumenical Council is held in Constantinople. In an edict, Emperor Justinian I condemns the Three Chapters, causing further schisms and heresies of monoenergism and monothelitism.

=== By place ===
==== Byzantine Empire ====
- August 13 – Byzantine Emperor Justinian I issues a pragmatic sanction reorganizing Italy, and rewards the praetorian prefect Liberius for over 60 years of distinguished service, granting him extensive estates in Italy.
- August 15 – The 554 Anatolia earthquake takes place in the southwest coasts of Anatolia (Asia Minor). It affects the Güllük Gulf (Mandalya Gulf), and the island of Kos.
- October – Battle of the Volturnus: During the spring Butilinus (Buccelin) has marched north; the Frankish army (infected by an epidemic of dysentery which kills their leader Leutharis (Lothair)) is reduced to about 30,000 men. The Byzantine army, with 18,000 men (including a contingent of Goths under Aligern), marches south to meet them at Casilinum (on the banks of the River Volturno). Byzantine eunuch general Narses sends a cavalry force under Chanaranges to destroy the supply wagons of the Franks. Outmanoeuvring Butilinus, he chooses a disposition similar to that at Taginae. After a frontal assault on the Byzantine centre, the Franks and the Alamanni are annihilated, thus effectively ending the Gothic War (535–554). Narses garrisons an army of 16,000 men in Italy. The recovery of the Italian Peninsula has cost the empire about 300,000 pounds of gold.

==== Europe ====
- Byzantine forces under Liberius seize Granada (Andalusia) and occupy the old province of Baetica. Justinian I calls Belisarius out of retirement, to complete the consolidation of reconquered regions of Southern Spain.
- Athanagild is crowned as king of the Visigoths and succeeds Agila I. He acknowledges the suzerainty of the Byzantine Empire.

==== Asia ====
- Al-Mundhir III ibn al-Nu'man is defeated and killed by the Ghassanids under al-Harith ibn Jabalah, at the battle of Yawm Halima; 'Amr III ibn al-Mundhir succeeds as king of the Lakhmid kingdom.
- Baekje and the Gaya Confederacy wage war upon Silla, one of the Three Kingdoms of Korea, but are defeated.
- Wideok becomes king of the Korean kingdom of Baekje.
- Muqan Qaghan succeeds his brother Issik Qaghan as emperor (khagan) of the Göktürks.
- The second and larger of the two Buddhas of Bamyan is erected in central Afghanistan.

==== China ====
- Gong Di succeeds his brother Fei Di as emperor of Western Wei. He is deposed by general Yuwen Tai who puts him to death.
- Siege and Fall of Jiangling: The Western Wei forces launched a military campaign against the Liang dynasty, targeting Jiangling, the Liang capital.
- After a protracted siege, Jiangling fell to the Western Wei army.
- Emperor Yuan of Liang (Xiao Yi) was captured during this assault and was subsequently executed.
- Mass Enslavement and Destruction: Following the capture of Jiangling, the city faced extensive looting and destruction. Historical records indicate that a large portion of the population was either killed or enslaved. The fall of Jiangling significantly weakened the Liang dynasty, leading to further internal strife and fragmentation. Power vacuums emerged, causing shifts in control among the remaining regional powers.
- Wei Shou completes compilation of the Book of Wei.

=== By topic ===
==== Religion ====
- Cassiodorus, Roman statesman, founds the Monastery at Vivarium (approximate date).

=== By place ===
==== Byzantine Empire ====
- By this date, the Roman Empire under Justinian I has reached its height. Justinian I has reconquered many former territories of the Western Roman Empire, including Italy, Dalmatia, Africa and Southern Hispania.
- An earthquake devastates the city of Latakia (modern Syria).

==== Europe ====
- King Chlothar I annexes the Frankish territories of Metz and Reims, after the death of his great-nephew Theudebald.

==== Britain ====
- King Erb of Gwent (in Southern Wales) dies; his kingdom is divided into Gwent and Ergyng (approximate date).

==== Persia ====
- Summer – Lazic War: The Byzantine army under Bessas is repulsed, and forced to retreat out of Archaeopolis (Georgia).
- King Gubazes II is invited to observe the siege of a Persian-held fortress, and is murdered by the Byzantine military staff after accusing them of incompetence.

==== Asia ====
- Chinese Liang dynasty: Jing Di, age 12, succeeds his father Yuan Di and is declared emperor by general Chen Baxian.
- The Rouran Khaganate ends; it is defeated by the Göktürks under Muqan Qaghan, who expands his rule in Central Asia.

=== By topic ===
==== Arts and sciences ====
- Around this time, the historian Jordanes writes several books, among them De origine actibusque Getarum (The origin and deeds of the Goths).
- Taliesin, British poet, becomes court bard to King Brochwel of Powys (approximate date).

==== Religion ====
- June 7 – Pope Vigilius dies at Syracuse on his journey back home. His body is brought to Rome and buried in the San Martino ai Monti.
- Cybi Felyn, abbot of Holyhead, dies at his monastery in Caer Gybi (approximate date).

=== By place ===
==== Europe ====
- King Chlothar I suppresses a revolt of the Saxons and Thuringi in Saxony (Germany). For some time he exacts a tribute of 500 cows every year.

==== Britain ====
- King Cynric and his son Ceawlin of Wessex fight against the Britons at Beranburh, now identified as Barbury Castle (Wiltshire) in South West England.

==== Persia ====
- Lazic War: A Byzantine expeditionary force under Justin retakes Archaeopolis (modern Georgia), and routs the Persian army.
- Siege of Phasis: The Persians are defeated at the besieged town of Phasis in Lazica, held by the Byzantines.
- King Khosrau I opens negotiations with Justinian I, leading to the establishment of a 50 year peace agreement in 562.

=== By topic ===
==== Religion ====
- April 16 – The diplomatic representative (apocrisiarius) to Constantinople is elected as Pope Pelagius I, succeeding Vigilius as the 60th pope of Rome.

=== By place ===
==== Europe ====
- The Avars arrive in the northern region of the Caucasus, between the Black Sea and the Caspian Sea. They send envoys to the Byzantines in Lazica (modern Georgia). Like the Huns, the Avars are the former elite of a central Asian federation, which has been forced to flee westwards.

==== Byzantine Empire ====
- December 14 – The 557 Constantinople earthquake occurs.

==== Asia ====
- The Western Wei Dynasty ends: Yuwen Hu deposes emperor Gong Di, and places Yuwen Tai's son Xiaomin on the throne. Yuwen Hu becomes regent and establishes the Northern Zhou dynasty in China.
- Ming Di is made emperor, after his younger brother Xiao Min Di is arrested while trying to assume power. Xiao Min Di is deposed and executed by Yuwen Hu.
- The Liang dynasty ends: Chen Wu Di, a distinguished general, becomes the first emperor of the Chen dynasty in Southern China.
- The Göktürks under Muqan Qaghan ally with the Persian Empire, and destroy the Hephthalites (White Huns) in Central Asia.

=== By topic ===
==== Religion ====
- King Chlothar I of the Franks founds the Abbey of St. Medard at Soissons (Northern France).
- The Jiming Temple in Nanjing is built; the Buddhist pagoda is located near Xuanwu Lake.

=== By place ===
==== Byzantine Empire ====
- May 7 – In Constantinople, the dome of the Hagia Sophia collapses due to an earthquake. Emperor Justinian I orders the dome to be rebuilt.

==== Europe ====
- The Avars and the Slavs occupy the Hungarian Plain on the Balkans. The threat of Avar domination prompts the Lombards to migrate to Italy.
- December 13 – King Chlothar I reunites the Frankish Kingdom after his brother Childebert I dies, becoming sole ruler of the Franks.
- December 23 - Chlothar I is crowned King of the Franks.
- Conall mac Comgaill becomes king of Dál Riata, a Gaelic overkingdom on the western coast of Scotland.

==== Asia ====
- Istämi, ruler of the Western Turkic Khaganate, establishes diplomatic relations with the Byzantine Empire.

=== By topic ===
==== Religion ====
- December 23 – The Abbey of Saint-Germain-des-Prés is dedicated by Germain, bishop of Paris.
- The Bangor Abbey is founded by the Irish abbot Comgall in Northern Ireland (approximate date).

=== By place ===
==== Byzantine Empire ====
- Winter – The Kutrigurs and Huns under Zabergan cross the frozen Danube River, and invade the Balkans. They raid Thracia and Macedonia, but are driven back near Constantinople by a Byzantine force under Belisarius.
- Battle of Melantias: Outside the city walls of Constantinople, Belisarius defeats the combined "barbarians" with his veteran cavalry (bucellarii), and a few thousand hastily raised levies.

==== Britain ====
- Glappa succeeds his father Ida as king of Bernicia (North East England). During his rule, Anglian settlers expand their territory in what is now southeastern Scotland.

==== Asia ====
- First successful human flight: a kite carrying Yuan Huangtou lands in the proximity of Ye. Emperor Wen Xuan Di sponsors the flight; Yuan is taken prisoner; other imprisoned kite flyers also fly, but those die and Yuan survives. Yuan is executed afterwards.
- Wen Di, age 37, succeeds his uncle Chen Wu Di as emperor of the Chen dynasty. During his reign, he consolidates the state against the rebellious warlords.
- The city-state Ara Gaya, a member of the Gaya confederacy, surrenders to Silla in the Korean Peninsula.
- Pyeongwon becomes ruler of the Korean kingdom of Goguryeo.

== Births ==
550

- probable
  - Pope Boniface IV (approximate date)
  - Finbarr of Cork, Irish bishop (approximate date)
  - Gallus, Irish missionary (approximate date)
  - Gaugericus, bishop of Cambrai (approximate date)
  - John Moschus, Byzantine monk (approximate date)
  - Peter III of Callinicum, Syriac Orthodox Patriarch of Antioch (approximate date)

551

- Ashina, empress of Northern Zhou (d. 582)
- Babai the Great, church father and theologian (approximate date)
- Germanus, Byzantine pretender (approximate date)
- Umako Soga, leader of the Soga clan (d. 626)

552

- Æthelberht, king (bretwalda) of Kent (approximate date)
- John the Merciful, patriarch of Alexandria (approximate date)

553

- December 10 – Houzhu, emperor of the Chen dynasty (d. 604)

554

- exact date unknown
  - Fei (Chen Bozong), emperor of the Chen dynasty (d. 570)
  - Suiko, empress of Japan (d. 628)
- probable Wendelin of Trier, Germanic hermit and abbot

555

- Basolus, French Benedictine and hermit (approximate date)
- Fatimah bint Asad, mother of Ali ibn Abi Talib (d. 626)
- Khadija, wife of Islamic prophet Muhammad (approximate date)

556

- Gao Bainian, crown prince of Northern Qi (d. 564)
- Amr Ibn Hashim, Arab pagan chieftain, and biggest enemy to the spread of early Islam

557

- Dushun, Chinese (Buddhist) patriarch (d. 640)
- Gao Wei, emperor of Northern Qi (d. 577)
- Ouyang Xun, Confucian scholar (d. 641)

558

- Gao Yan, prince of Northern Qi (d. 571)
- Yu Shinan, calligrapher and official (d. 638)

559

- Reccared I, king of the Visigoths (d. 601)
- Wu Shihuo, father of Wu Zetian (d. 635)
- Xuan Di, emperor of Northern Zhou (d. 580)

== Deaths ==
550

- May 8 – Desideratus, French saint
- exact date unknown
  - Aryabhata, Indian mathematician-astronomer (b. 476)
  - Buddhapālita, Indian Madhyamaka scholar (b. 470)
  - Drest V, king of the Picts
  - Germanus, Byzantine general (magister militum)
- probable
  - Dubricius, British bishop and saint
  - Eustathius of Mtskheta, Orthodox Christian saint

551

- Jianwen Di, emperor of the Liang Dynasty (b. 503)
- Wen Di, emperor of Western Wei (b. 507)
- Xiao Daqi, crown prince of Northern Qi (b. 524)

552

- February 5 – Dacius, archbishop of Milan
- July 1 – Totila, king of the Ostrogoths
- December 13 – Columba of Terryglass, Irish abbot and saint
- Aba I, patriarch of the Church of the East
- Anicius Maximus, Roman patrician
- Aratius, Armenian general
- Bumin Qaghan, ruler of the Göktürks
- Hou Jing, regent of the Liang dynasty
- Menas, patriarch of Constantinople
- Turismod, prince of the Lombards
- Wang Wei, chief strategist of the Liang dynasty
- Xiao Dong, emperor of the Liang dynasty
- Xiaojing, emperor of Eastern Wei (b. 524)

553

- August 5 – Xiao Ji, prince of the Liang dynasty (b. 508)
- exact date unknown
  - Gelimer, king of the Vandals and Alans (b. 480)
  - Issik Qaghan, ruler of the Turkic Khaganate
  - Teia, king of the Ostrogoths

554

- March - Agila I, king of the Visigoths
- exact date unknown
  - Al-Mundhir III ibn al-Nu'man, king of the Lakhmid kingdom (Iraq)
  - Fei Di (Yuan Qin), emperor of Western Wei
  - Mermeroes, Persian general
  - Seong, king of Baekje (Korea)
- probable
  - Liberius, Roman aristocrat
  - Yuwen, empress of Western Wei

555

- January 27 – Yuan Di, emperor of the Liang dynasty (b. 508)
- June 7 – Pope Vigilius
- September/October - Gubazes II, king of Lazica (Georgia)
- exact date unknown
  - Helier, Flemish-born hermit and patron saint of Jersey
  - Ly Thien Bao, emperor of Vietnam (b. 499)
  - Theudebald, king of Austrasia
  - Wang Sengbian, general of the Liang dynasty
- probable
  - Cybi Felyn, Cornish bishop
  - Erb of Gwent, Welsh king

556

- February 22 – Maximianus, Bishop of Ravenna (b. 499)
- Echu Tirmcharna, king of Connacht (Ireland)
- Erzhu Ying'e, empress of Northern Wei
- Romanos the Melodist, Syrian poet (approximate date)
- Xiao Yuanming, emperor of the Liang Dynasty
- Yuwen Tai, general of Western Wei (b. 507)

557

- March 14 – Leobinus, bishop of Chartres
- exact date unknown
  - Saint Cyriacus the Anchorite, legendary centenarian (b. 448)
  - Xiao Min Di, emperor of Northern Zhou (b. 542)

558

- May 1 – Marcouf, missionary and saint
- May 13 – John the Silent, bishop and saint
- May 15 – Hilary of Galeata, Christian monk
- December 13 – Childebert I, king of the Franks
- Abraham of Kratia, Christian monk (approximate date)
- Empress Dugu, Northern Zhou consort
- Gabrán mac Domangairt, king of Dál Riata
- Jing Di, emperor of the Liang Dynasty (b. 543)

559

- Chen Wu Di, emperor of the Chen dynasty (b. 503)
- Ida, king of Bernicia (approximate date)
- Leonard of Noblac, Frankish abbot and saint
- Wen Xuan Di, emperor of Northern Qi (b. 529)
