= 553 =

553 in various calendars
Gregorian calendar	553; DLIII
Ab urbe condita	1306
Armenian calendar	2 ԹՎ Բ
Assyrian calendar	5303
Balinese saka calendar	474–475
Bengali calendar	−41 – −40
Berber calendar	1503
Buddhist calendar	1097
Burmese calendar	−85
Byzantine calendar	6061–6062
Chinese calendar	壬申年 (Water Monkey); 3250 or 3043 — to — 癸酉年 (Water Rooster); 3251 or 3044
Coptic calendar	269–270
Discordian calendar	1719
Ethiopian calendar	545–546
Hebrew calendar	4313–4314
- Hindu calendars
Vikram Samvat	609–610
Shaka Samvat	474–475
Kali Yuga	3653–3654
Holocene calendar	10553
Iranian calendar	69 BP – 68 BP
Islamic calendar	71 BH – 70 BH
Javanese calendar	441–442
Julian calendar	553; DLIII
Korean calendar	2886
Minguo calendar	1359 before ROC 民前1359年
Nanakshahi calendar	−915
Seleucid era	864/865 AG
Thai solar calendar	1095–1096
Tibetan calendar	阳水猴年 (male Water-Monkey); 679 or 298 or −474 — to — 阴水鸡年 (female Water-Rooster); 680 or 299 or −473

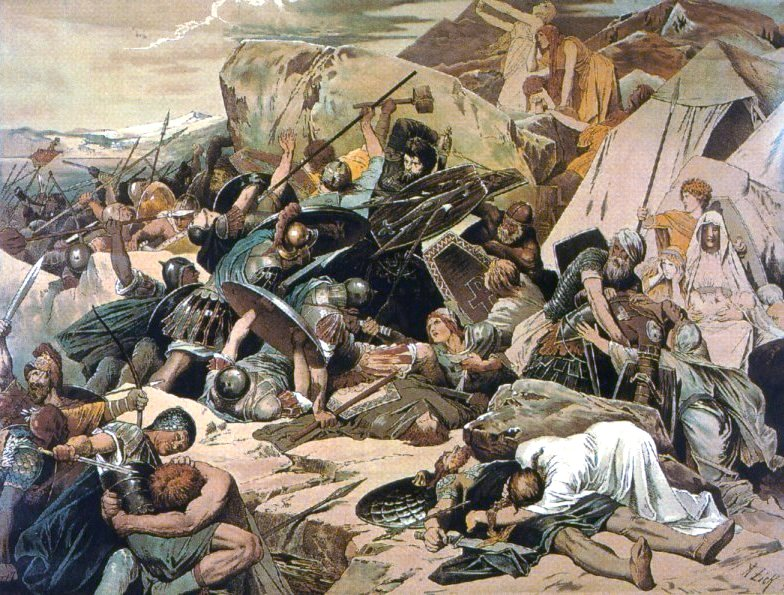
The Battle of Mons Lactarius (553)

Year 553 (DLIII) was a common year starting on Wednesday of the Julian calendar. The denomination 553 for this year has been used since the early medieval period, when the Anno Domini calendar era became the prevalent method in Europe for naming years.

== Events ==
=== By place ===
==== Byzantine Empire ====
- Battle of Mons Lactarius: King Teia secretly marches to join forces with his brother Aligern in Campania, to relieve the siege of Cumae. Meanwhile at Mons Lactarius (modern Monti Lattari), Narses lays an ambush. The combined Gothic force is crushed in a hopeless last stand for two days (south of Naples), and Teia is killed in the fighting. Aligern escapes, but surrenders a few months later.
- The Ostrogothic Kingdom ends after 60 years of rule in Italy. The Goths are allowed to return to their homes in peace and (re)settle in modern-day Austria. Some 7,000 people retreat to Campsas (Southern Gaul), and resist with minimal help from the Franks against the Byzantines until 554.
- The Sassanid commander Mihr-Mihroe force the Byzantines to retreat from Telephis and later Ollaria. (See Battle of Telephis–Ollaria).

==== Europe ====
- Gothic War: Frankish invasion — Two Frankish-Alemanni dukes, brothers Lothair and Buccelin, cross the Alps from Germany with a force of 75,000 men, mostly Frankish infantry. In the Po Valley, they win an easy victory over a much smaller Byzantine force at Parma, and are joined by remnants of the Gothic armies, bringing the total strength of the invaders to about 90,000 men. Narses, gathering his forces as quickly as possible, marches north to harass the Franks, but is not strong enough to engage them in battle. In Samnium (Southern Italy) the brothers divide their forces: Lothaire goes down the east coast, then returns to the north, to winter in the Po Valley. Buccelin follows the west coast into Calabria, where he spends the winter — his army being seriously wasted by attrition and disease.

==== Asia ====
- King Seong of Baekje attacks the kingdoms of Goguryeo and Silla. However, under a secret agreement, Silla troops attack the exhausted Baekje army, and take possession of the entire Han River valley.
- In the Turkic Khaganate Istemi is appointed governor (yabgu) in the west of the empire (modern Turkestan), and Muqan Qaghan succeeds his brother Issik Qaghan as emperor (khagan) of the Göktürks.

=== By topic ===
==== Religion ====
- May 5 – The Fifth Ecumenical Council is held in Constantinople. In an edict, Emperor Justinian I condemns the Three Chapters, causing further schisms and heresies of monoenergism and monothelitism.

== Births ==
- December 10 – Houzhu, emperor of the Chen dynasty (d. 604)

== Deaths ==
- August 5 – Xiao Ji, prince of the Liang dynasty (b. 508)
- exact date unknown
  - Gelimer, king of the Vandals and Alans (b. 480)
  - Issik Qaghan, ruler of the Turkic Khaganate
  - Teia, king of the Ostrogoths
