= 554 =

554 in various calendars
- Gregorian calendar: 554; DLIV
- Ab urbe condita: 1307
- Armenian calendar: 3 ԹՎ Գ
- Assyrian calendar: 5304
- Balinese saka calendar: 475–476
- Bengali calendar: −40 – −39
- Berber calendar: 1504
- Buddhist calendar: 1098
- Burmese calendar: −84
- Byzantine calendar: 6062–6063
- Chinese calendar: 癸酉年 (Water Rooster); 3251 or 3044 — to — 甲戌年 (Wood Dog); 3252 or 3045
- Coptic calendar: 270–271
- Discordian calendar: 1720
- Ethiopian calendar: 546–547
- Hebrew calendar: 4314–4315
- Hindu calendars
- Vikram Samvat: 610–611
- Shaka Samvat: 475–476
- Kali Yuga: 3654–3655
- Holocene calendar: 10554
- Iranian calendar: 68 BP – 67 BP
- Islamic calendar: 70 BH – 69 BH
- Javanese calendar: 442–443
- Julian calendar: 554; DLIV
- Korean calendar: 2887
- Minguo calendar: 1358 before ROC 民前1358年
- Nanakshahi calendar: −914
- Seleucid era: 865/866 AG
- Thai solar calendar: 1096–1097
- Tibetan calendar: ཆུ་མོ་བྱ་ལོ་ (female Water-Bird); 680 or 299 or −473 — to — ཤིང་ཕོ་ཁྱི་ལོ་ (male Wood-Dog); 681 or 300 or −472

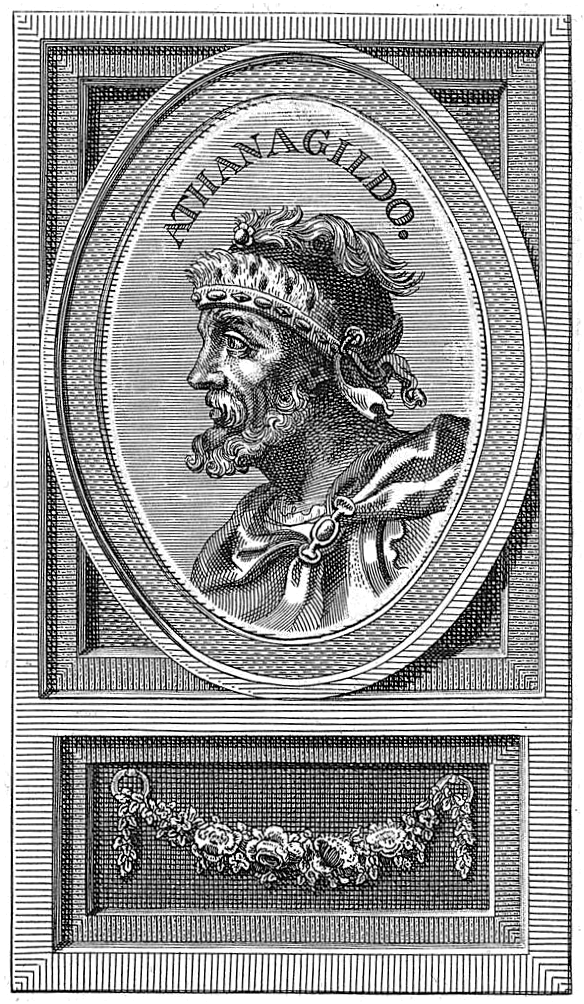
King Athanagild (554–567)

Year 554 (DLIV) was a common year starting on Thursday of the Julian calendar. The denomination 554 for this year has been used since the early medieval period, when the Anno Domini calendar era became the prevalent method in Europe for naming years.

== Events ==
=== By place ===
==== Byzantine Empire ====
- August 13 – Byzantine Emperor Justinian I issues a pragmatic sanction reorganizing Italy, and rewards the praetorian prefect Liberius for over 60 years of distinguished service, granting him extensive estates in Italy.
- August 15 – The 554 Anatolia earthquake takes place in the southwest coasts of Anatolia (Asia Minor). It affects the Güllük Gulf (Mandalya Gulf), and the island of Kos.
- October – Battle of the Volturnus: During the spring Butilinus (Buccelin) has marched north; the Frankish army (infected by an epidemic of dysentery which kills their leader Leutharis (Lothair)) is reduced to about 30,000 men. The Byzantine army, with 18,000 men (including a contingent of Goths under Aligern), marches south to meet them at Casilinum (on the banks of the River Volturno). Byzantine eunuch general Narses sends a cavalry force under Chanaranges to destroy the supply wagons of the Franks. Outmanoeuvring Butilinus, he chooses a disposition similar to that at Taginae. After a frontal assault on the Byzantine centre, the Franks and the Alamanni are annihilated, thus effectively ending the Gothic War (535–554). Narses garrisons an army of 16,000 men in Italy. The recovery of the Italian Peninsula has cost the empire about 300,000 pounds of gold.

==== Europe ====
- Byzantine forces under Liberius seize Granada (Andalusia) and occupy the old province of Baetica. Justinian I calls Belisarius out of retirement, to complete the consolidation of reconquered regions of Southern Spain.
- Athanagild is crowned as king of the Visigoths and succeeds Agila I. He acknowledges the suzerainty of the Byzantine Empire.

==== Asia ====
- Al-Mundhir III ibn al-Nu'man is defeated and killed by the Ghassanids under al-Harith ibn Jabalah, at the battle of Yawm Halima; 'Amr III ibn al-Mundhir succeeds as king of the Lakhmid kingdom.
- Baekje and the Gaya Confederacy wage war upon Silla, one of the Three Kingdoms of Korea, but are defeated.
- Wideok becomes king of the Korean kingdom of Baekje.
- Muqan Qaghan succeeds his brother Issik Qaghan as emperor (khagan) of the Göktürks.
- The second and larger of the two Buddhas of Bamyan is erected in central Afghanistan.

==== China ====
- Gong Di succeeds his brother Fei Di as emperor of Western Wei. He is deposed by general Yuwen Tai who puts him to death.
- Siege and Fall of Jiangling: The Western Wei forces launched a military campaign against the Liang dynasty, targeting Jiangling, the Liang capital.
- After a protracted siege, Jiangling fell to the Western Wei army.
- Emperor Yuan of Liang (Xiao Yi) was captured during this assault and was subsequently executed.
- Mass Enslavement and Destruction: Following the capture of Jiangling, the city faced extensive looting and destruction. Historical records indicate that a large portion of the population was either killed or enslaved. The fall of Jiangling significantly weakened the Liang dynasty, leading to further internal strife and fragmentation. Power vacuums emerged, causing shifts in control among the remaining regional powers.
- Wei Shou completes compilation of the Book of Wei.

=== By topic ===
==== Religion ====
- Cassiodorus, Roman statesman, founds the Monastery at Vivarium (approximate date).
- Pope Vigilius was allowed to return to Rome after years of pressure from Emperor Justinian regarding the Second Council of Constantinople.

== Births ==
- exact date unknown
  - Fei (Chen Bozong), emperor of the Chen dynasty (d. 570)
  - Suiko, empress of Japan (d. 628)
- probable Wendelin of Trier, Germanic hermit and abbot

== Deaths ==
- March - Agila I, king of the Visigoths
- exact date unknown
  - Al-Mundhir III ibn al-Nu'man, king of the Lakhmid kingdom (Iraq)
  - Fei Di (Yuan Qin), emperor of Western Wei
  - Mermeroes, Persian general
  - Seong, king of Baekje (Korea)
- probable
  - Liberius, Roman aristocrat
  - Yuwen, empress of Western Wei

== Sources ==
- Antonopoulos, J. (1980), Data from investigation of seismic Sea waves events in the Eastern Mediterranean from 500 to 1000 A.D., Annals of Geophysics
