= 555 =

Calendar year

555 in various calendars
- Gregorian calendar: 555; DLV
- Ab urbe condita: 1308
- Armenian calendar: 4 ԹՎ Դ
- Assyrian calendar: 5305
- Balinese saka calendar: 476–477
- Bengali calendar: −39 – −38
- Berber calendar: 1505
- Buddhist calendar: 1099
- Burmese calendar: −83
- Byzantine calendar: 6063–6064
- Chinese calendar: 甲戌年 (Wood Dog); 3252 or 3045 — to — 乙亥年 (Wood Pig); 3253 or 3046
- Coptic calendar: 271–272
- Discordian calendar: 1721
- Ethiopian calendar: 547–548
- Hebrew calendar: 4315–4316
- Hindu calendars
- Vikram Samvat: 611–612
- Shaka Samvat: 476–477
- Kali Yuga: 3655–3656
- Holocene calendar: 10555
- Iranian calendar: 67 BP – 66 BP
- Islamic calendar: 69 BH – 68 BH
- Javanese calendar: 443–444
- Julian calendar: 555; DLV
- Korean calendar: 2888
- Minguo calendar: 1357 before ROC 民前1357年
- Nanakshahi calendar: −913
- Seleucid era: 866/867 AG
- Thai solar calendar: 1097–1098
- Tibetan calendar: ཤིང་ཕོ་ཁྱི་ལོ་ (male Wood-Dog); 681 or 300 or −472 — to — ཤིང་མོ་ཕག་ལོ་ (female Wood-Boar); 682 or 301 or −471

Year 555 (DLV) was a common year starting on Friday of the Julian calendar. The denomination 555 for this year has been used since the early medieval period, when the Anno Domini calendar era became the prevalent method in Europe for naming years.

== Events ==
=== By place ===
==== Byzantine Empire ====
- By this date, the Roman Empire under Justinian I has reached its height. Justinian I has reconquered many former territories of the Western Roman Empire, including Italy, Dalmatia, Africa and Southern Hispania.
- An earthquake devastates the city of Latakia (modern Syria).

==== Europe ====
- King Chlothar I annexes the Frankish territories of Metz and Reims, after the death of his great-nephew Theudebald.

==== Britain ====
- King Erb of Gwent (in Southern Wales) dies; his kingdom is divided into Gwent and Ergyng (approximate date).

==== Persia ====
- Summer – Lazic War: The Byzantine army under Bessas is repulsed, and forced to retreat out of Archaeopolis (Georgia).
- King Gubazes II is invited to observe the siege of a Persian-held fortress, and is murdered by the Byzantine military staff after accusing them of incompetence.

==== Asia ====
- Chinese Liang dynasty: Jing Di, age 12, succeeds his father Yuan Di and is declared emperor by general Chen Baxian.
- The Rouran Khaganate ends; it is defeated by the Göktürks under Muqan Qaghan, who expands his rule in Central Asia.

=== By topic ===
==== Arts and sciences ====
- Around this time, the historian Jordanes writes several books, among them De origine actibusque Getarum (The origin and deeds of the Goths).
- Taliesin, British poet, becomes court bard to King Brochwel of Powys (approximate date).

==== Religion ====
- June 7 – Pope Vigilius dies at Syracuse on his journey back home. His body is brought to Rome and buried in the San Martino ai Monti.
- Cybi Felyn, abbot of Holyhead, dies at his monastery in Caer Gybi (approximate date).

== Births ==
- Basolus, French Benedictine and hermit (approximate date)
- Fatimah bint Asad, mother of Ali ibn Abi Talib (d. 626)
- Khadija, wife of Islamic prophet Muhammad (approximate date)

== Deaths ==
- January 27 – Yuan Di, emperor of the Liang dynasty (b. 508)
- June 7 – Pope Vigilius
- September/October - Gubazes II, king of Lazica (Georgia)
- exact date unknown
  - Helier, Flemish-born hermit and patron saint of Jersey
  - Ly Thien Bao, emperor of Vietnam (b. 499)
  - Theudebald, king of Austrasia
  - Wang Sengbian, general of the Liang dynasty
- probable
  - Cybi Felyn, Cornish bishop
  - Erb of Gwent, Welsh king

== Sources ==
- Bury, John Bagnell (2011) [1958]. History of the Later Roman Empire: From the Death of Theodosius I to the Death of Justinian, Volume 2. Mineola, New York: Dover Publications. ISBN 0-486-20399-9.
- Greatrex, Geoffrey; Lieu, Samuel N. C. (2002). The Roman Eastern Frontier and the Persian Wars (Part II, 363–630 AD). London, United Kingdom: Routledge. ISBN 0-415-14687-9.
- Martindale, John R., ed. (1992). The Prosopography of the Later Roman Empire: Volume III, AD 527–641. Cambridge: Cambridge University Press. ISBN 0-521-20160-8.
