= Battle of Mons Lactarius =

Battle during the Justinian's Gothic War

- Part of the Gothic War (535–554)
- Main army movements during the second phase of the Gothic War
Date	1 or 30 October 552 (Note: There is a disagreement in the sources regarding the date of the battle. Historian J. B. Bury notes that this disagreement concerns the date of 1 October provided by the eighth-century historian Andreas Agnellus in his work Liber Pontificalis. Bury considers that Teia arrived in Campania at the end of August and not earlier, and thus if the two armies spend two months standstill according to Procopius then Agnellus's date is probably wrong. Historian Ilkka Syvänne considers both dates.)
Location	Monti Lattari, Campania, Italy
Result	Byzantine victory

Belligerents
Byzantine Empire	Ostrogothic Kingdom

Commanders and leaders
Narses; John the Sanguinary	Teia †

Strength
Unknown (Note: Narses's army before invading the Ostrogoths' territories in the Italian Peninsula was about 20,000, so at the battle these numbers should have been lower. Approximately half the army was composed of 5,500 Lombard allies, 3,000 Heruls, and 400 Gepids. After the Battle of Taginae, Narses dismissed the Lombard allies.)	Unknown; (Smaller force)

The Battle of Mons Lactarius took place in October 552 during the Gothic War (535–554) between Byzantine forces and the Ostrogoths (Goths) at Mount Lactarius near Mount Vesuvius in Italy.

After the defeat and death of the Gothic King Totila at the Battle of Taginae, Teia was chosen as the new Gothic king, who attempted to gather allies and the remaining Gothic forces. The Byzantines, led by Chamberlain Narses, moved to besiege Cumae, where much of Totila's war chest resided. Following this news, Teia moved to break the siege, but Narses intercepted him in the rugged terrain near Mount Vesuvius. After two months of stalemate, the two sides engaged in open battle. Teia was killed in the fighting, effectively ending organized Gothic royal leadership. The remaining Gothic troops resisted for two days but then surrendered under negotiated terms. This victory ended the Gothic state, allowing the Byzantines to reestablish their authority in the Italian Peninsula.

== Background ==
In 540, the capital of the Gothic kingdom, Ravenna, was surrendered to general Belisarius, effectively bringing most of the Italian Peninsula under Byzantine control. However, after his recall to Constantinople, corruption among Byzantine commanders and the harsh taxation of the Italian populace reignited the Gothic resistance.

Totila, the new Gothic king, reorganized the Gothic forces and gained support by treating Italian civilians more fairly than some Byzantine officials had. After nearly a decade, Totila successfully recaptured much of Italy, including important cities and territories. In response, the Byzantine emperor Justinian I sent his chamberlain, Narses, to lead a new campaign against the Goths. At Salona in the Dalmatia region, a Byzantine army had been assembled under the supervision of John the Sanguinary, comprising regular Byzantine units and several contingents of foreign allies, notably Lombards, Heruls, and Gepids. Narses marched around the Adriatic Sea and through Italy to reach Rome. Totila was compelled to intercept Narses before reaching Rome. The two armies engaged in combat near Taginae, where Totila was mortally wounded, and much of his Gothic army was defeated and scattered.

== Prelude ==
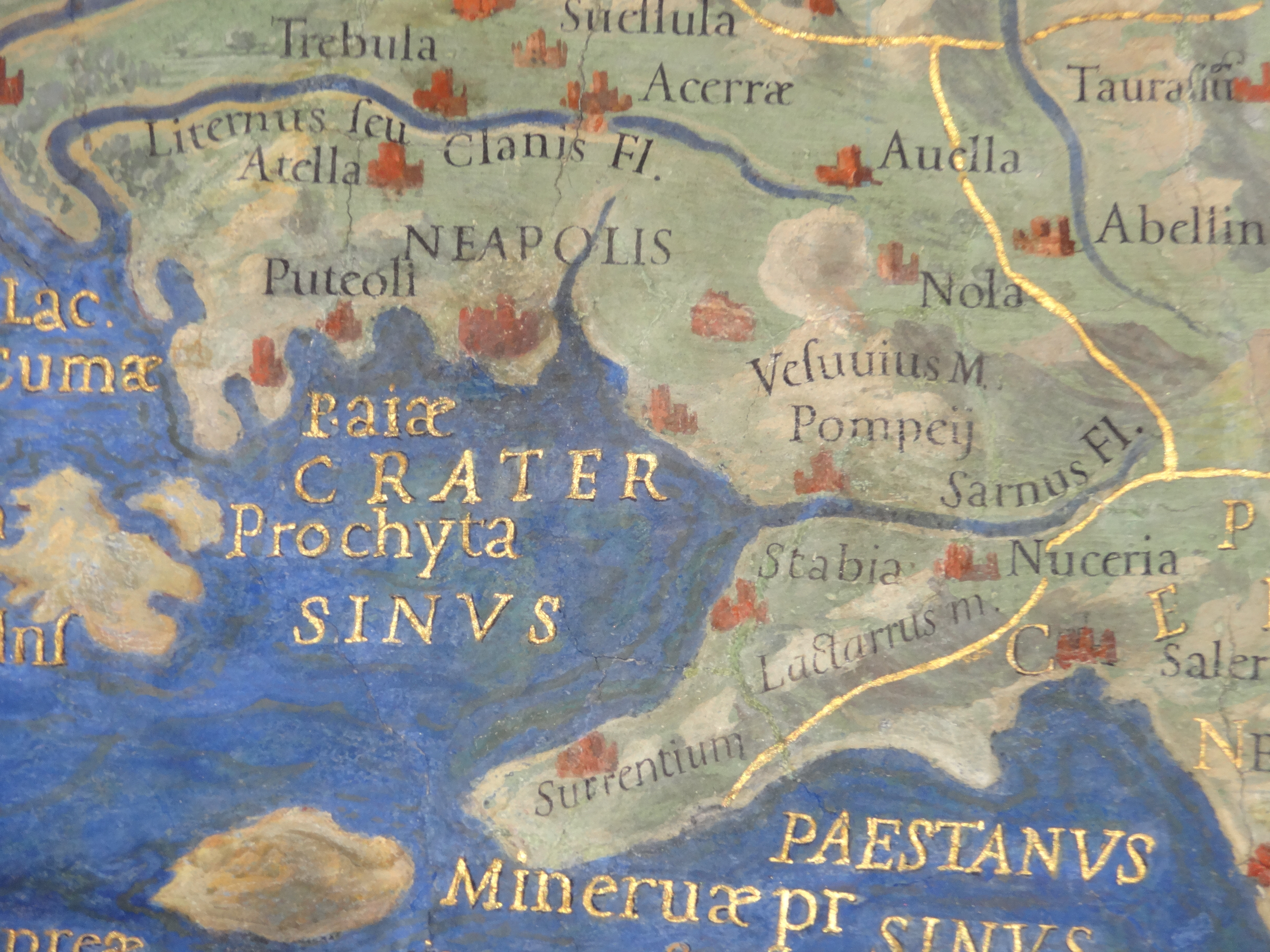
Map of the Bay of Naples

After the death of Totila, the remaining Gothic forces gathered at Ticinum, where they chose the former second-in-command, Teia, as their new king. Teia sent envoys to the Franks in hopes of forming an alliance, because the Goths lacked sufficient manpower to confront the Byzantines. However, the Franks refused, preferring to let the Goths and Byzantines wear each other down, thereby easing their eventual conquest of Italy.

Narses marched towards Rome, seizing in the process the towns of Narni and Spoleto. Rome was recaptured without difficulty in July 552, and the keys of its gates were delivered to Justinian. When the Goths learned that Rome had fallen, they executed their hostages, including senators along with their families and 300 children whom Totila had taken from the leading families of various cities. They also carried out widespread killings against the Italian population, spreading fear and violence throughout the region. After the fall of Rome, Narses continued to besiege Cumae. Following this news, Teia marched south to relieve the siege of Cumae, where Totila's hoard was stored and was necessary to fund the war. His brother also commanded the city's garrison. To avoid contact with Byzantine forces, Teia took several lengthy detours during his advance, which took nearly thirty days of marching. Historian J. B. Bury argues that Teia anticipated that the land routes to Cumae, north of Naples, would be guarded, and he probably intended to embark his troops near Sorrento and reach Cumae by sea using the Gothic supply fleet. However, Narses learned of his movements and intercepted the Gothic army near Mount Vesuvius (because of the route Teia chose), blocking its path to Cumae. At the time, Narses did not have a fleet to confront the Gothic navy or prevent the resupply of the Gothic army, but the Byzantine army was able to prevent such a transport taking place.

== Battle ==
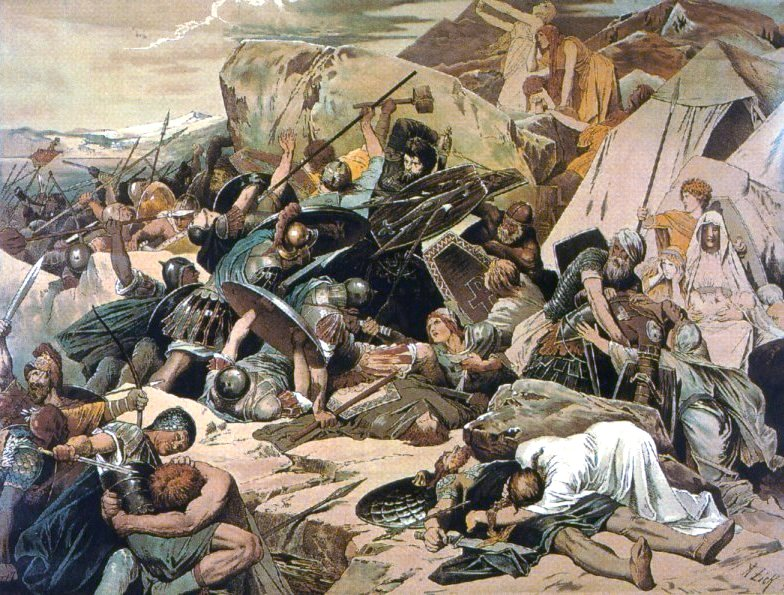
Battle on the slopes of Mount Vesuvius. Depiction by Alexander Zick, 1890

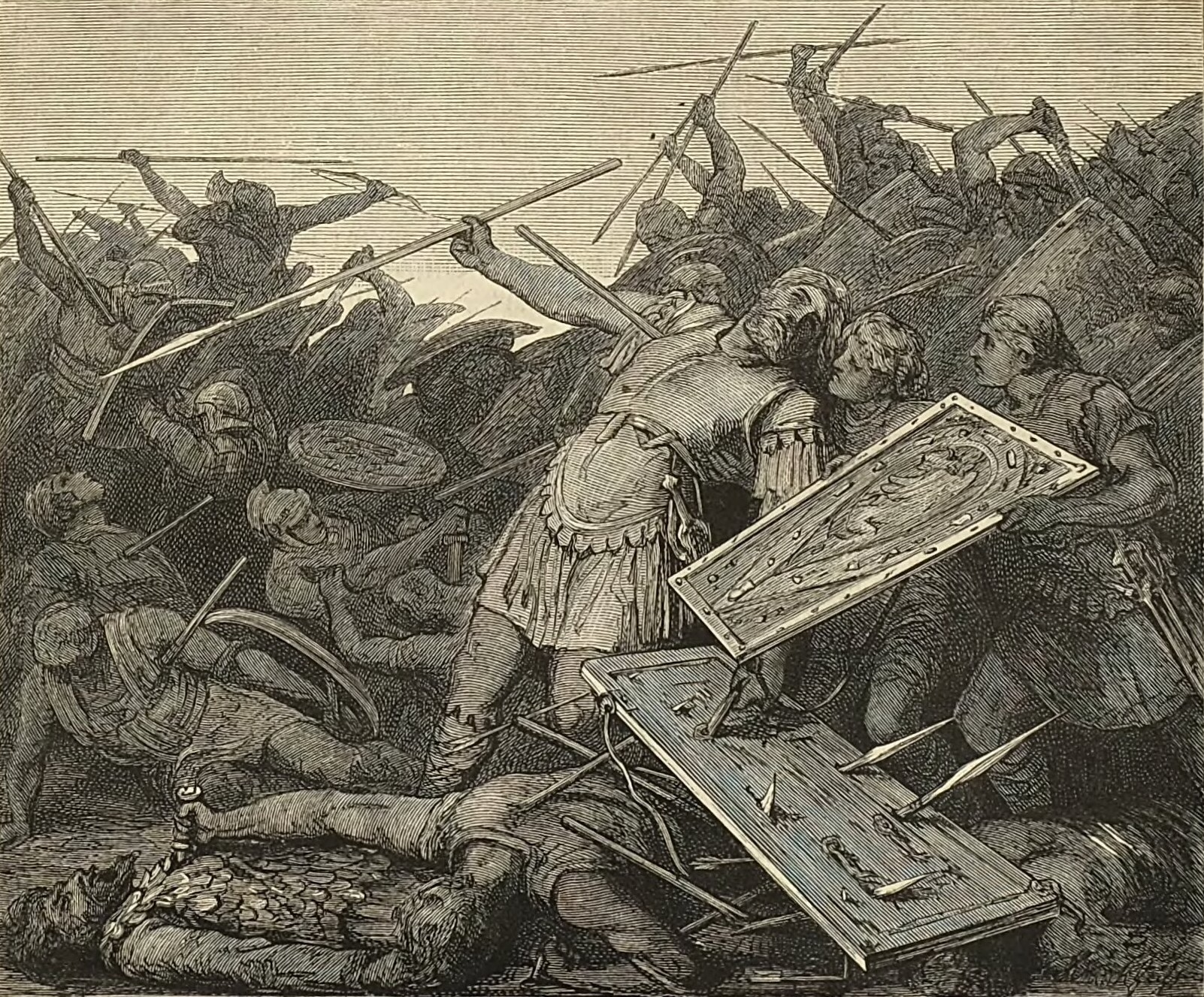
The death of Teia by Hermann Knackfuss c. 1871

Upon arrival, Teia positioned himself at the foot of Mount Vesuvius, near the site of Pompeii, on the left bank of the Sarno River. The two sides stood across a small stream with the Gothic camp positioned near the only bridge of the stream and erected towers with ballistas for its defense. The standstill lasted nearly two months with only minor skirmishes between them and single combat at the bridge over the stream. In the end, Narses brought up his fleet and, by exploiting the treachery of the Gothic admiral, who surrendered the Gothic fleet to the Byzantines once he learned of the approach of the Byzantine navy, cut off the Goths' supply route, forcing Teia to act before his army faced starvation.

Teia and his army withdrew from their initial position towards Mount Lactarius, where they lured the Byzantine army into rough terrain. At this location, they launched a surprise attack that took place on 1 or 30 October, with the Byzantines holding their ground. Both armies dismounted, due to the terrain, and adopted a deep phalanx formation. Teia led his forces in an attack on the Byzantine lines, but the Goths could not break through. The Byzantine troops attempted several times to kill Teia with throwing spears, only for Teia's comrades to resupply him with new shields. After several attempts, Teia died in the fight. (Note: The primary source by Procopius claims that a javelin ("ἀκοντίῳ") pierced him and killed him instantly.) Teia's head was taken by the Byzantine soldiers and fixed on a stake to discourage the Goths from fighting. The Gothic troops continued to fight for another two days. In the end, they sent an envoy to negotiate permission to withdraw from Italy while keeping their own money for travel expenses. John advised Narses to accept the proposal, warning of the risks of a prolonged battle against the Goths' fierce resistance. Narses agreed to terms under strict conditions.

== Aftermath ==
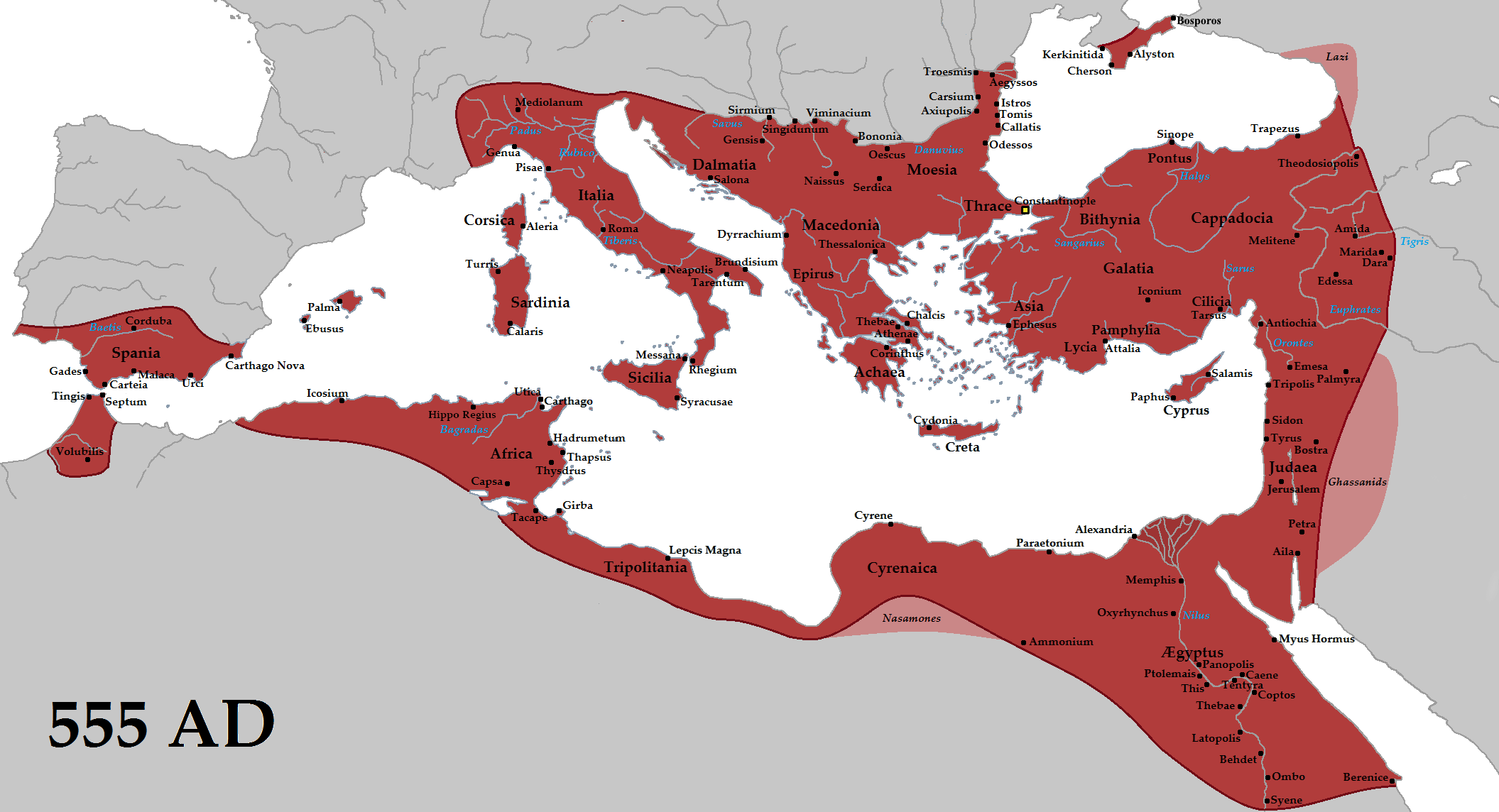
The Byzantine Empire after the end of the Gothic War in 555

The Gothic survivors were released under an oath to leave Italy, taking with them only their personal money and movable property, deposited in various fortresses in Italy as traveling funds. The battle marked the end of the Ostrogoths in the Italian Peninsula. A thousand Goths under the leadership of Indulf broke away from the agreement and resisted along with other Goth leaders, Aligern (Teia's brother) in Cumae and Ragnaris in Conza della Campania. The Goths failed to appoint a new king, which exposed the fragility of their remaining power. Narses quickly captured a number of cities that lacked Goth garrisons, including Florence, Centumcellae, Volaterrae, and Pisa.

The defeat of the Goths triggered another request from the Goths north of the River Po to the Franks to intervene. A 75,000-strong Frankish army, under Alamannic dukes Lothar and Buccelin, moved south into Italy in the following year. While the Franks outnumbered the Byzantines, the Byzantines had better supplies and fortifications. In October 554, Narses defeated the Franks in the Battle of the Volturnus, eliminating them as a threat. The remaining cities in Italy under the Goths started to fall; notable cities were Campsa in 555 and Verona in 561.
