= 474 =

474 in various calendars
- Gregorian calendar: 474; CDLXXIV
- Ab urbe condita: 1227
- Assyrian calendar: 5224
- Balinese saka calendar: 395–396
- Bengali calendar: −120 – −119
- Berber calendar: 1424
- Buddhist calendar: 1018
- Burmese calendar: −164
- Byzantine calendar: 5982–5983
- Chinese calendar: 癸丑年 (Water Ox); 3171 or 2964 — to — 甲寅年 (Wood Tiger); 3172 or 2965
- Coptic calendar: 190–191
- Discordian calendar: 1640
- Ethiopian calendar: 466–467
- Hebrew calendar: 4234–4235
- Hindu calendars
- Vikram Samvat: 530–531
- Shaka Samvat: 395–396
- Kali Yuga: 3574–3575
- Holocene calendar: 10474
- Iranian calendar: 148 BP – 147 BP
- Islamic calendar: 153 BH – 152 BH
- Javanese calendar: 359–360
- Julian calendar: 474; CDLXXIV
- Korean calendar: 2807
- Minguo calendar: 1438 before ROC 民前1438年
- Nanakshahi calendar: −994
- Seleucid era: 785/786 AG
- Thai solar calendar: 1016–1017
- Tibetan calendar: ཆུ་མོ་གླང་ལོ་ (female Water-Ox); 600 or 219 or −553 — to — ཤིང་ཕོ་སྟག་ལོ་ (male Wood-Tiger); 601 or 220 or −552

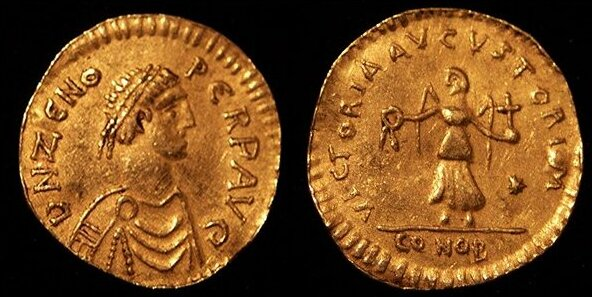
Emperor Zeno (474–491)

Year 474 (CDLXXIV) was a common year starting on Tuesday of the Julian calendar. At the time, it was known as the Year of the Consulship of Leo without colleague (or, less frequently, year 1227 Ab urbe condita). The denomination 474 for this year has been used since the early medieval period, when the Anno Domini calendar era became the prevalent method in Europe for naming years.

== Events ==
=== By place ===
==== Roman Empire ====
- January 18 – Emperor Leo I dies of dysentery at Constantinople, after a 17-year reign. He is succeeded by his 7-year-old grandson Leo II, who briefly becomes ruler of the Byzantine Empire.
- February 9 – Zeno, father of Leo II, is crowned as co-emperor (Augustus). He rules the empire together with his son, and stabilises the Eastern frontier.
- June 24 – Julius Nepos arrives at Portus, and marches on Ravenna. He forces Glycerius to abdicate the throne, and proclaims himself emperor of the Western Roman Empire.
- Glycerius is exiled to Dalmatia (Balkans) and becomes bishop of Salona. Neither the Senate nor the Gallo-Roman aristocracy decide to resist, and Nepos accepts the imperial purple.
- November 17 – Leo II dies of an unknown disease (possibly poisoned by his mother Ariadne), after a reign of 10 months. Zeno becomes sole Eastern Emperor.
- Winter – Zeno sends an embassy, to conclude a peace with King Genseric. He succeeds in an agreement with the Vandals, to secure the commercial routes in the Mediterranean.

=== By topic ===
==== Art ====
- A statue of a Standing Buddha from Sarnath, Uttar Pradesh, (during the Gupta period) is made. It is now kept at the Sarnath Museum in India (source states the creation date as 1st to 2nd century BCE).

== Births ==
- Abraham of Kratia, Christian monk, saint (approximate date)
- Anthemius of Tralles, Greek architect, mathematician (approximate date)
- Clotilde, Christian wife of Clovis I, ancestress of the succeeding Merovingian kings (Approximate date) (d.545)
- Magnus Felix Ennodius, bishop, Latin poet (approximate date)

== Deaths ==
- January 18 – Leo I, Byzantine emperor (b. 401)
- November 17 – Leo II, Byzantine emperor (b. 467)
