= 541 =

Calendar year

541 in various calendars
- Gregorian calendar: 541; DXLI
- Ab urbe condita: 1294
- Assyrian calendar: 5291
- Balinese saka calendar: 462–463
- Bengali calendar: −53 – −52
- Berber calendar: 1491
- Buddhist calendar: 1085
- Burmese calendar: −97
- Byzantine calendar: 6049–6050
- Chinese calendar: 庚申年 (Metal Monkey); 3238 or 3031 — to — 辛酉年 (Metal Rooster); 3239 or 3032
- Coptic calendar: 257–258
- Discordian calendar: 1707
- Ethiopian calendar: 533–534
- Hebrew calendar: 4301–4302
- Hindu calendars
- Vikram Samvat: 597–598
- Shaka Samvat: 462–463
- Kali Yuga: 3641–3642
- Holocene calendar: 10541
- Iranian calendar: 81 BP – 80 BP
- Islamic calendar: 84 BH – 83 BH
- Javanese calendar: 428–429
- Julian calendar: 541; DXLI
- Korean calendar: 2874
- Minguo calendar: 1371 before ROC 民前1371年
- Nanakshahi calendar: −927
- Seleucid era: 852/853 AG
- Thai solar calendar: 1083–1084
- Tibetan calendar: ལྕགས་ཕོ་སྤྲེ་ལོ་ (male Iron-Monkey); 667 or 286 or −486 — to — ལྕགས་མོ་བྱ་ལོ་ (female Iron-Bird); 668 or 287 or −485

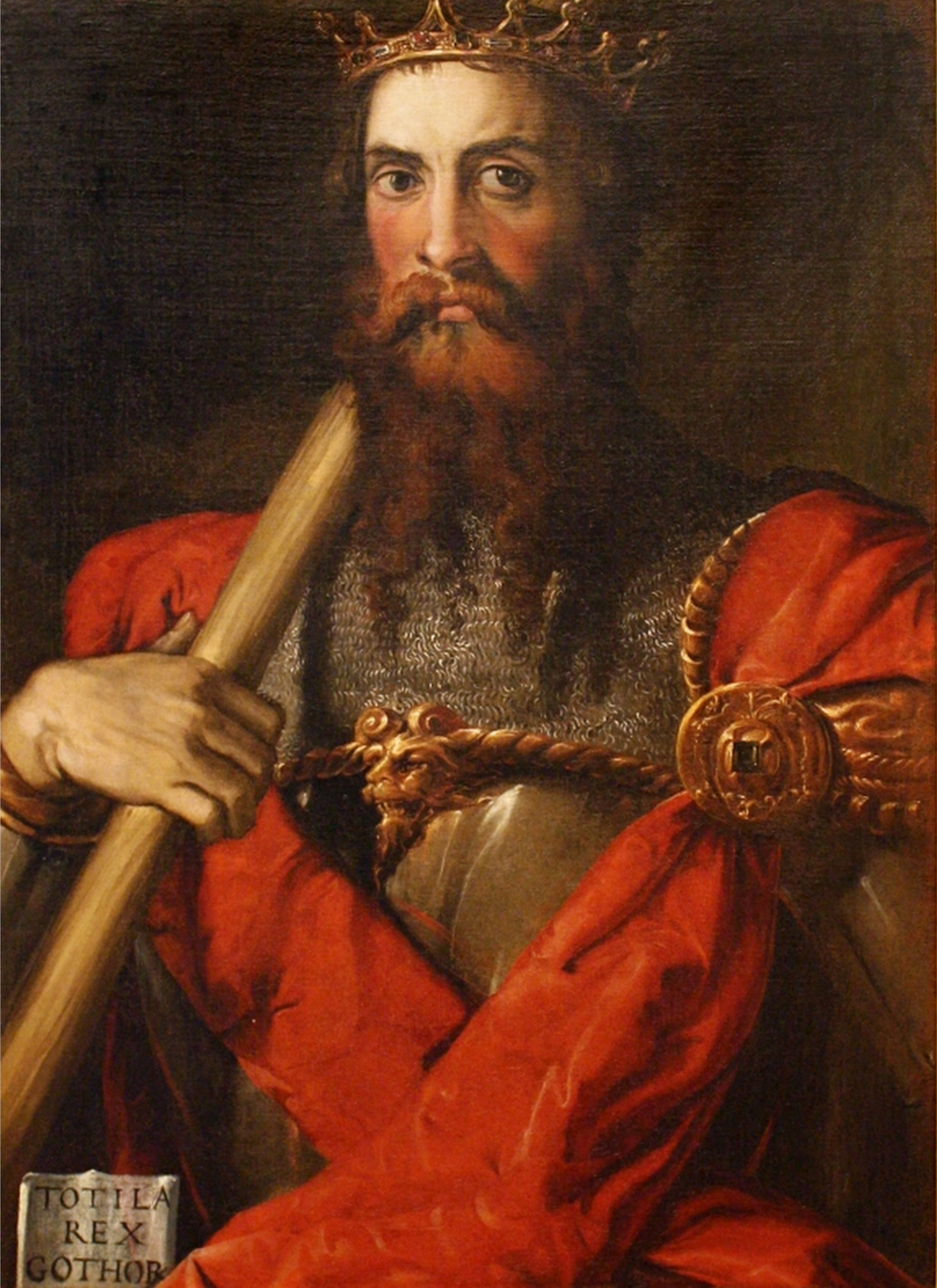
Totila, king of the Ostrogoths (541–552)

The Lazic War (541–562)

Year 541 (DXLI) was a common year starting on Tuesday of the Julian calendar. In the Roman Empire, it was known as the Year of the Consulship of Basilius without colleague (or, less frequently, year 1294 Ab urbe condita). Basilius was the last person to be officially appointed Roman consul, since after this year, the office was permanently merged with the office of Roman/Byzantine emperor. Thus, from the next year forward, the consular year dating was abandoned. The denomination 541 for this year has been used since the early medieval period, when the Anno Domini calendar era became the prevalent method in Europe for naming years.

== Events ==
=== By place ===
==== Byzantine Empire ====
- January 1 – Anicius Faustus Albinus Basilius is appointed as consul in Constantinople, the last person to hold this office.
- Plague of Justinian: Bubonic plague appears suddenly in the Egyptian port of Pelusium, spreading to Alexandria and, the following year, to Constantinople. This is the beginning of a 200-year-long pandemic that will devastate Europe, the Middle East, and North Africa.
- Emperor Justinian I recalls Belisarius from Italy to handle the situation in Armenia. He arrives in Upper Mesopotamia and attacks the fortress city of Nisbis. After an unsuccessful siege he ravages the countryside.
- John the Cappadocian, praetorian prefect of the East, is dismissed by the Byzantine empress Theodora for treason. He is banished to Cyzicus, and his estates are confiscated.

==== Europe ====
- Autumn – Totila is elected king by the Ostrogothic nobles after the death of his uncle Ildibad. He wins the support of the lower classes by liberating slaves and distributing land to the peasants.
- Winter – Siege of Verona: Totila defends the city of Verona against a numerically superior Byzantine army. He gains control over the Po Valley and prepares a Gothic offensive in Central Italy.

==== Persia ====
- Lazic War: King Khosrau I intervenes in Lazica (modern Georgia), and supports the weakened king Gubazes II against a full-scale uprising. He sends an expeditionary force under Mermeroes and captures the Byzantine stronghold of Petra, located on the coast of the Black Sea, which provides the Persians a strategic port.

==== Asia ====
- Lý Bí initiates a rebellion against the ruling Chinese Liang dynasty in Giao Châu province.
- The Uyghurs come under the rule of the Hephthalites (approximate date).

=== By topic ===
==== Religion ====
- Jacob Baradaeus becomes bishop of Edessa (approximate date).

== Births ==
- July 21 – Emperor Wen of Sui, emperor of the Sui dynasty (d. 604)

== Deaths ==
- Adhurgunbadh, Persian general
- John Tzibus, Byzantine governor-merchant in Lazica
- Eraric, king of the Ostrogoths
- Ildibad, king of the Ostrogoths

== Sources ==
- Bury, John Bagnall (1923). History of the Later Roman Empire.
- Martindale, John R., ed. (1992). The Prosopography of the Later Roman Empire: Volume III, AD 527–641. Cambridge: Cambridge University Press. ISBN 0-521-20160-8.
