= 467 =

467 in various calendars
- Gregorian calendar: 467; CDLXVII
- Ab urbe condita: 1220
- Assyrian calendar: 5217
- Balinese saka calendar: 388–389
- Bengali calendar: −127 – −126
- Berber calendar: 1417
- Buddhist calendar: 1011
- Burmese calendar: −171
- Byzantine calendar: 5975–5976
- Chinese calendar: 丙午年 (Fire Horse); 3164 or 2957 — to — 丁未年 (Fire Goat); 3165 or 2958
- Coptic calendar: 183–184
- Discordian calendar: 1633
- Ethiopian calendar: 459–460
- Hebrew calendar: 4227–4228
- Hindu calendars
- Vikram Samvat: 523–524
- Shaka Samvat: 388–389
- Kali Yuga: 3567–3568
- Holocene calendar: 10467
- Iranian calendar: 155 BP – 154 BP
- Islamic calendar: 160 BH – 159 BH
- Javanese calendar: 352–353
- Julian calendar: 467; CDLXVII
- Korean calendar: 2800
- Minguo calendar: 1445 before ROC 民前1445年
- Nanakshahi calendar: −1001
- Seleucid era: 778/779 AG
- Thai solar calendar: 1009–1010
- Tibetan calendar: མེ་ཕོ་རྟ་ལོ་ (male Fire-Horse); 593 or 212 or −560 — to — མེ་མོ་ལུག་ལོ་ (female Fire-Sheep); 594 or 213 or −559

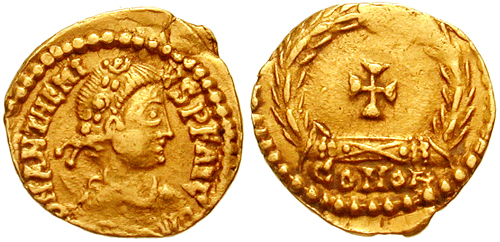
Emperor Anthemius (467–472)

Year 467 (CDLXVII) was a common year starting on Sunday of the Julian calendar. At the time, it was known as the Year of the Consulship of Pusaeus and Iohannes (or, less frequently, year 1220 Ab urbe condita). The denomination 467 for this year has been used since the early medieval period, when the Anno Domini calendar era became the prevalent method in Europe for naming years.

== Events ==
=== By place ===
==== Roman Empire ====
- April 12 – Emperor Leo I has his general Anthemius elected emperor of the Western Roman Empire. He allies himself with Ricimer, de facto ruler of Rome, and marries Anthemius's daughter Alypia to him, to strengthen the relationship and end the hostilities between the Eastern and Western Empire.
- Summer – Vandal War (461-468): King Genseric extends his pirate raids in the Mediterranean Sea; the Vandals sack and enslave the people living in Illyricum, the Peloponnese and other parts of Greece. Leo I joins forces with the Western Empire.

==== Britannia ====
- Ancient Hillforts in Britain are re-fortified, and the Wansdyke is built (approximate date).

==== Asia ====
- Emperor Skandagupta dies after a 12-year reign, as the Huns consolidate their conquests in western India. He is succeeded by his half-brother Purugupta.

== Births ==
- October 13 – Emperor Xiaowen of Northern Wei (d. 499)
- Cerdic, first king of Anglo-Saxon Wessex (approximate date)
- Leo II, Byzantine emperor (d. 474)

== Deaths ==
- Benignus of Armagh, Irish bishop (approximate date)
- Skandagupta, ruler of the Gupta Empire (India)
