= 604 =

Calendar year

604 in various calendars
- Gregorian calendar: 604; DCIV
- Ab urbe condita: 1357
- Armenian calendar: 53; ԹՎ ԾԳ
- Assyrian calendar: 5354
- Balinese saka calendar: 525–526
- Bengali calendar: 10–11
- Berber calendar: 1554
- Buddhist calendar: 1148
- Burmese calendar: −34
- Byzantine calendar: 6112–6113
- Chinese calendar: 癸亥年 (Water Pig); 3301 or 3094 — to — 甲子年 (Wood Rat); 3302 or 3095
- Coptic calendar: 320–321
- Discordian calendar: 1770
- Ethiopian calendar: 596–597
- Hebrew calendar: 4364–4365
- Hindu calendars
- Vikram Samvat: 660–661
- Shaka Samvat: 525–526
- Kali Yuga: 3704–3705
- Holocene calendar: 10604
- Iranian calendar: 18 BP – 17 BP
- Islamic calendar: 19 BH – 18 BH
- Japanese calendar: N/A
- Javanese calendar: 493–494
- Julian calendar: 604; DCIV
- Korean calendar: 2937
- Minguo calendar: 1308 before ROC 民前1308年
- Nanakshahi calendar: −864
- Seleucid era: 915/916 AG
- Thai solar calendar: 1146–1147
- Tibetan calendar: ཆུ་མོ་ཕག་ལོ་ (female Water-Boar); 730 or 349 or −423 — to — ཤིང་ཕོ་བྱི་བ་ལོ་ (male Wood-Rat); 731 or 350 or −422

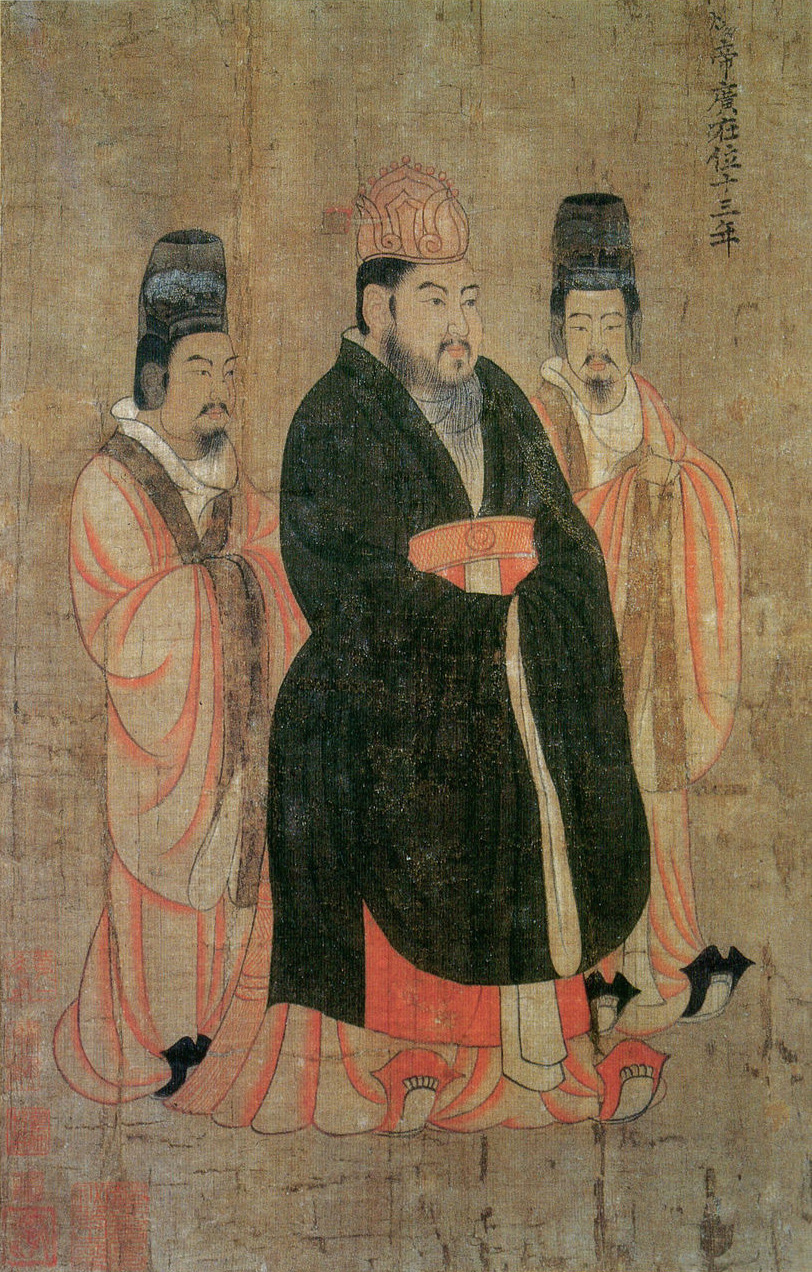
Emperor Yángdi of the Sui dynasty (569–618)

Year 604 (DCIV) was a leap year starting on Wednesday of the Julian calendar. The denomination 604 for this year has been used since the early medieval period, when the Anno Domini calendar era became the prevalent method in Europe for naming years.

== Events ==
=== By place ===
==== Byzantine Empire ====
- The Avars regroup after they are almost destroyed; together with the Slavs they start pillaging through the Byzantine provinces, west and south of the Danube. Due to the new Persian war, Emperor Phocas has few imperial troops available to defend the Balkan Peninsula.
- Byzantine–Persian War: King Khosrau II captures the Byzantine positions east of the Euphrates; the Persians destroy many cities in the Levant region, after prolonged sieges such as the Byzantine fortress of Dara (modern Turkey).

==== Europe ====
- Queen Brunhilda of Austrasia conspires to have Berthoald, Mayor of the Palace, assassinated. She convinces King Theuderic II to send him to inspect the royal villae along the Seine. Brunhilda then has the noblemen who actually carried out the murder arrested and killed.
- December 25 – Battle of Ėtampes: Theuderic II, with the aid of Berthoald, defeats the Frankish forces under King Chlothar II of Neustria, at Étampes (near Paris).

==== Britain ====
- Æthelfrith of Northumbria invades Deira and kills its king, Æthelric. Prince Edwin, son of the late king Ælla of Deira (possibly a nephew of Æthelric), flees to the court of King Iago of Gwynedd (northwest Wales).
- Sæbert succeeds his father Sledd as king of Essex. He is persuaded to convert to Christianity through the intervention of his uncle, King Æthelberht of Kent.

==== Asia ====
- August 13 – Emperor Wéndi dies, age 63, presumably assassinated by his son Yángdi, after a 23-year reign in which he has attacked hereditary privilege and reduced the power of the military aristocracy. He is succeeded by Yángdi, who becomes the second emperor of the Sui dynasty.
- Prince Shotoku, imperial regent of Empress Suiko, issues a Seventeen-article constitution, based on both Confucian and Buddhist principles in Japan.

=== By topic ===
==== Religion ====
- March 12 – Pope Gregory I (the Great) dies at Rome, after a 14-year tenure. He has laid the foundations which claim papal absolutism, pioneered the conversion of Britain to Roman Catholicism and enunciated what will come to be known as the "seven deadly sins". Gregory is succeeded by Sabinian as the 65th pope of the Catholic Church.
- May 26 – Augustine, Archbishop of Canterbury, is succeeded by Laurence. He is a member of the Gregorian mission (see 596).
- Æthelberht of Kent founds St. Paul's Cathedral. Mellitus is appointed the first Saxon bishop of London (and Essex).
- The See of Rochester is established, and Justus is appointed as bishop. He founds Rochester Cathedral (Kent).

== Births ==
- Oswald, king (bretwalda) of Northumbria (approximate date)

== Deaths ==
- March 12 – Gregory I, pope of the Catholic Church
- May 26 – Augustine, Archbishop of Canterbury (approximate date)
- August 13 – Emperor Wen of Sui, emperor of the Sui dynasty (b. 541)
- November 4 – Yohl Ik'nal, female ruler of Palenque (Mexico)
- December 16 – Houzhu, emperor of the Chen dynasty (b. 553)
- Æthelric, king of Deira (approximate date)
- Berthoald, Mayor of the Palace (Burgundy)
- Colmán Rímid, High King of Ireland
- Sledd, king of Essex (approximate date)
- Xiao Mohe, general of the Sui dynasty (b. 532)
- Yang Yong, prince of the Sui dynasty
