= Chanaranges (Italy) =

Chanaranges (Greek: Χαναράγγης) was a Byzantine military officer, active in the late reign of Justinian I (r. 527–565). He was an Armenian and his name is occasionally rendered as Charanges (Greek: Χαράγγης). He is only known for his activities in the Gothic War, in particular the Battle of the Volturnus in 554. The main source about him is Agathias. The name probably derives from Kanārang, a military title of the Sassanid Empire. He should probably not be confused with his contemporary, the Chanaranges who took part in the conspiracy of Artabanes.

== Biography ==
Chanaranges was reportedly a native of Byzantine Armenia. Agathias gives his title in Greek as taxiarch (Greek: ταξίαρχος), describing him as commanding a tagma. His Latin title was probably comes rei militaris.

He is first mentioned in late 554, serving under Narses. His forces took part in a campaign against the Franks of Butilinus. Narses set his camp near the river Casilinum (Volturnus, Volturno). Chanaranges was stationed in the same camp, at the side nearest to the enemy.

Chanaranges was sent against the supply wagons of the Franks. He easily captured the wagons and killed the drivers. The Franks had built a tower in the area, guarding the bridge that crossed the river. Chanaranges drove one of the captured wagons to the castle. He set the wagon on fire, the flames spreading to the tower and destroying it. The bridge passed under Byzantine control. The events directly led to the Battle of the Volturnus, a decisive Byzantine victory. Nothing further is known of him after that.

Agathias describes Chanaranges as very brave and ready to take risks, but also as sufficiently cautious to avoid unnecessary dangers.

== Sources ==
- Bury, John Bagnell (1958) [1923]. History of the Later Roman Empire: From the Death of Theodosius I to the Death of Justinian, Volume 2. Mineola, New York: Dover Publications. OCLC 41478187.
- Martindale, John R., ed. (1992). The Prosopography of the Later Roman Empire: Volume III, AD 527–641. Cambridge: Cambridge University Press. ISBN 0-521-20160-8.
