= 499 =

Calendar year

499 in various calendars
- Gregorian calendar: 499; CDXCIX
- Ab urbe condita: 1252
- Assyrian calendar: 5249
- Balinese saka calendar: 420–421
- Bengali calendar: −95 – −94
- Berber calendar: 1449
- Buddhist calendar: 1043
- Burmese calendar: −139
- Byzantine calendar: 6007–6008
- Chinese calendar: 戊寅年 (Earth Tiger); 3196 or 2989 — to — 己卯年 (Earth Rabbit); 3197 or 2990
- Coptic calendar: 215–216
- Discordian calendar: 1665
- Ethiopian calendar: 491–492
- Hebrew calendar: 4259–4260
- Hindu calendars
- Vikram Samvat: 555–556
- Shaka Samvat: 420–421
- Kali Yuga: 3599–3600
- Holocene calendar: 10499
- Iranian calendar: 123 BP – 122 BP
- Islamic calendar: 127 BH – 126 BH
- Javanese calendar: 385–386
- Julian calendar: 499; CDXCIX
- Korean calendar: 2832
- Minguo calendar: 1413 before ROC 民前1413年
- Nanakshahi calendar: −969
- Seleucid era: 810/811 AG
- Thai solar calendar: 1041–1042
- Tibetan calendar: ས་ཕོ་སྟག་ལོ་ (male Earth-Tiger); 625 or 244 or −528 — to — ས་མོ་ཡོས་ལོ་ (female Earth-Hare); 626 or 245 or −527

Year 499 (CDXCIX) was a common year starting on Friday of the Julian calendar. At the time, it was known as the Year of the Consulship of Iohannes without colleague (or, less frequently, year 1252 Ab urbe condita). The denomination 499 for this year has been used since the early medieval period, when the Anno Domini calendar era became the prevalent method in Europe for naming years.

== Events ==
=== By place ===
==== China ====
- April 26 – Emperor Xiaowen of Northern Wei dies of starvation in his capital at Luoyang, after a 27-year reign in which he has Sinicized his tribal relatives (Tuoba clan), created a Chinese-style government and instituted a land-reform program.
- Crown prince Xuan Wu Di, age 16, succeeds his father Xiaowen and becomes emperor of Northern Wei. He appoints his uncle Yuan Xie provincial governor, who serves temporarily as regent to form a new government.

==== Middle East ====
- September – The 499 Nicopolis earthquake takes place in the borders between the regions of Mesopotamia, Pontus, and Roman Armenia. It affects the cities of Nicopolis, Neocaesarea (modern Niksar), Arsamosata, and Abarne, as well as the cultural areas of Anatolia (Asia Minor) and Mesopotamia.

=== By topic ===
==== Religion ====
- March 1 – During a synod in Rome, which is attended by 72 bishops and all of the Roman clergy, Pope Symmachus makes Antipope Laurentius bishop of the diocese of Nocera in Campania.

==== Major wars and battles in Europe ====
In 499, the Bulgars cross the Danube and reach Thrace where, on the banks of the river Tzurta (considered a tributary of Maritsa), they defeat a 15,000 men strong Roman army, led by magister militum Aristus. Often overlooked due to the Battle of Ongal (180 years later), the 499-500 AD events demonstrate not only the strength and ambition of the Bulgars to rule over the lower Danube and South-East European lands, but also that their origins historically date back to late antiquity and not the early medieval ages as is often considered.

==== Mathematics ====
- Indian mathematician Aryabhata writes his magnum opus, the Āryabhaṭīya.

== Births ==
- Ingund, queen of the Franks (approximate date)
- Ly Thien Bao, emperor of Vietnam (d. 555)
- Maximianus, bishop of Ravenna (d. 556)

== Deaths ==
- April 26 – Emperor Xiaowen of Northern Wei, emperor of Northern Wei (b. 467)
- Feng Run, Chinese empress of Northern Wei

== Sources ==
- Guidoboni, Emanuela; Traina, Giusto (1995), "A new catalogue of earthquakes in the historical Armenian area from antiquity to the 12th century", Annals of Geophysics, 38, doi:10.4401/ag-4134
