= 508 =

Calendar year

508 in various calendars
- Gregorian calendar: 508; DVIII
- Ab urbe condita: 1261
- Assyrian calendar: 5258
- Balinese saka calendar: 429–430
- Bengali calendar: −86 – −85
- Berber calendar: 1458
- Buddhist calendar: 1052
- Burmese calendar: −130
- Byzantine calendar: 6016–6017
- Chinese calendar: 丁亥年 (Fire Pig); 3205 or 2998 — to — 戊子年 (Earth Rat); 3206 or 2999
- Coptic calendar: 224–225
- Discordian calendar: 1674
- Ethiopian calendar: 500–501
- Hebrew calendar: 4268–4269
- Hindu calendars
- Vikram Samvat: 564–565
- Shaka Samvat: 429–430
- Kali Yuga: 3608–3609
- Holocene calendar: 10508
- Iranian calendar: 114 BP – 113 BP
- Islamic calendar: 118 BH – 117 BH
- Javanese calendar: 394–395
- Julian calendar: 508; DVIII
- Korean calendar: 2841
- Minguo calendar: 1404 before ROC 民前1404年
- Nanakshahi calendar: −960
- Seleucid era: 819/820 AG
- Thai solar calendar: 1050–1051
- Tibetan calendar: མེ་མོ་ཕག་ལོ་ (female Fire-Boar); 634 or 253 or −519 — to — ས་ཕོ་བྱི་བ་ལོ་ (male Earth-Rat); 635 or 254 or −518

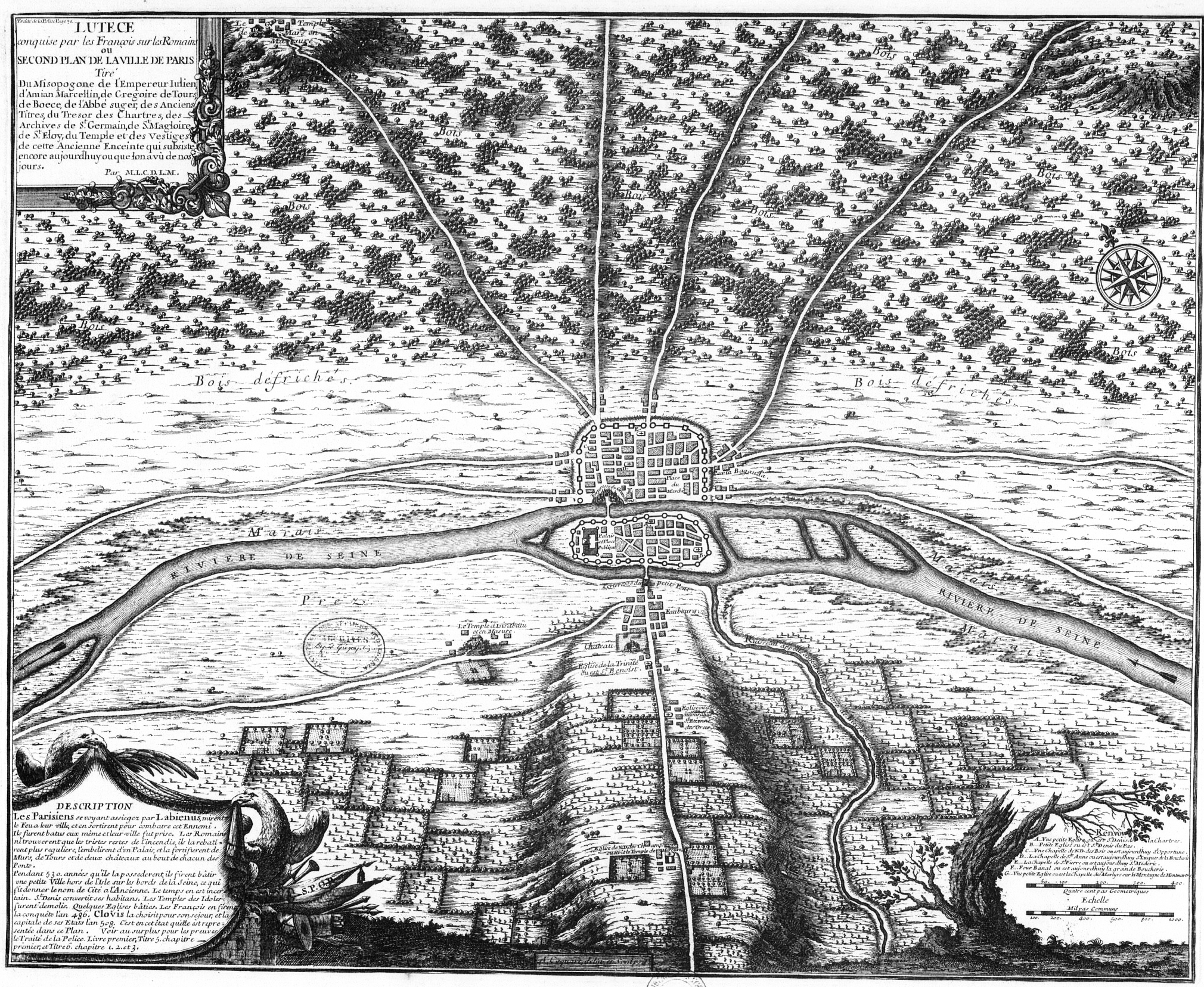
Map of Lutetia (18th century rendition)

Year 508 (DVIII) was a leap year starting on Tuesday of the Julian calendar. In the Roman Empire, it was known as the Year of the Consulship of Venantius and Celer (or, less frequently, year 1261 Ab urbe condita). The denomination 508 for this year has been used since the early medieval period, when the Anno Domini calendar era became the prevalent method in Europe for naming years.

== Events ==
=== By place ===
==== Byzantine Empire ====
- Emperor Anastasius I formally recognizes Clovis I of the Salian Franks as ruler of Gaul. He sends a Byzantine fleet of 100 warships to raid the coasts of Italy.

==== Britannia ====
- Battle of Netley: King Cerdic of Wessex moves with an Anglo-Saxon army inland, and defeats the British king, Nudd-Lludd (according to the Anglo-Saxon Chronicle).
- Winter – All the rivers in England are frozen for more than two months.

==== Europe ====
- King Clovis I fails in an effort to take the walled city of Carcassonne (Southern Gaul). He establishes Paris (Lutetia) as his capital and gets baptized, making Roman Catholicism the official religion of the Kingdom of the Franks.
- King Theodoric the Great sends an Ostrogoth army, led by his sword-bearer Theudis, drives the Franks out of Provence, and recovers Septimania (Languedoc) from the Visigoths.

== Births ==
- September 16 – Yuan Di, emperor of the Liang Dynasty (d. 555)
- Xiao Ji, prince of the Liang Dynasty (d. 553)

== Deaths ==
- Geraint, king of Dumnonia (approximate date)
- Natanleod, king of Wales
- Yuan Xie, prince of the Northern Wei Dynasty
- Yujiulü Futu, ruler (khan) of the Rouran (Mongolia)

== Bibliography ==
- Pryor, John H.; Jeffreys, Elizabeth M. (2006). The Age of the ΔΡΟΜΩΝ: The Byzantine Navy ca. 500–1204. Brill Academic Publishers. ISBN 978-90-04-15197-0.
