= 554 Anatolia earthquake =

Natural Disaster

- Location within Greece
- Local date: 15 August 554
- Magnitude: 6.2 M_{e} (equivalent magnitude from seimic intensity data)
- Epicenter: 36.833°N 27.167°E
- Areas affected: Kos, Southwest Anatolia
- Max. intensity: MMI IX (Violent)-MMI X (Extreme)
- Tsunami: major

The 554 Anatolia earthquake took place on August 15, 554 in the southwest coasts of Anatolia (Asia Minor). It affected the Güllük Gulf (Mandalya Gulf), and the island of Kos.

Details of the earthquake come primarily from the historians John Malalas (6th century), Agathias (6th century), Theophanes the Confessor (9th century), and George Kedrenos (11th century).

The earthquake severely damaged the city of Tralles (modern Aydın), the island of Kos as well as the island of Kalymnos. An area of 8.5 km2 of the land was cut off from the main island of Kalymnos forming the island known nowadays as Telendos. Lesser damage was reported from the cities of Nicomedia (modern İzmit) and Antioch (modern Antakya). The earthquake was reportedly felt as far as Constantinople (modern Istanbul), and areas of the Middle East.

The earthquake caused a seismic sea wave (tsunami) which reportedly flooded many coastal areas in southern Anatolia. The waters advanced over 1 mi (1.6 km) inland, reportedly transporting with it ships and marine animals. The historian Agathias visited the island of Kos shortly after the earthquake. He reported that the tsunami demolished whatever buildings had been left standing in the island's main city following the earthquake.

The Corpus Scriptorum Historiae Byzantinae (1828–1897) mentions several other earthquakes for the year 554. The earthquakes shook Anatolia, the Arabian Peninsula, Mesopotamia, Palestine. The cities of Alexandria, Beirut, and Constantinople reportedly suffered damage from these earthquakes. The vast area affected suggests multiple earthquakes over a relatively short period of time.

The main earthquake is dated to 554, but the historian Carolus Sigonius (16th century) estimated that the event occurred in either 555 or 556.

== Sources ==
- Antonopoulos, J. (1980). "Data from investigation of seismic Sea waves events in the Eastern Mediterranean from 500 to 1000 A.D.". Annals of Geophysics.
