= Battle of the Volturnus =

554 battle in Europe

- Part of the Gothic War (535–554)
- Main army movements during the second phase of the Gothic War
Date	Autumn 554 AD
Location	Volturno River, near Casilinum, Italy
Result	Byzantine victory

Belligerents
Byzantine Empire; Heruli mercenaries	Franks; Alemanni

Commanders and leaders
Narses	Butilinus †

Strength
18,000 men	30,000 men (Note: Historians consider Agathias's figure for the army's size to be an exaggeration and instead estimate that it was approximately equal in strength to the Byzantine army.)

Casualties and losses
80 (Note: This number is based on the record by Agathias, but modern historians doubt this.)	5 survived (Note: This number is based on the record by Agathias, but modern historians doubt this.)

The Battle of the Volturnus, also known as the Battle of Casilinum or Battle of Capua, was fought in 554 near the Volturno River between an army of the Byzantine Empire and a combined force of Franks and Alemanni. The Byzantines, led by the general Narses, were victorious, marking the end of the Gothic War (535–554).

After the death of the Ostrogothic king Teia, a 75,000-strong force of Franks and Alemanni under Leutharis and Butilinus invaded Italy and threatened Byzantine control of the peninsula in the spring of 553. Initially, Narses avoided direct engagement with the Frankish army, staying behind walls most of the year. This course of action effectively allowed the Franks to pillage as they moved south along the Italian Peninsula. The Frankish army split into two parts. One part of the army, led by Leutharis, moved north, but upon reaching the River Po, it was decimated by plague. The second army, led by Butilinus, continued to pillage, but once it moved north, it was intercepted by Narses with an army of approximately 18,000 men near the Volturno River.

Before the battle, Byzantine cavalry disrupted the Franks' supply lines and destroyed a watchtower guarding a bridge over the river. This prompted both sides to assemble for battle. The Franks, emboldened by news that the Byzantine center appeared weak due to a dispute between Narses and his Heruli mercenaries, formed their forces into a wedge formation. Narses then deployed his forces, with infantry in the center with a small gap in the middle, and cavalry on the flanks, drawing the Frankish army into a frontal assault. The Franks pressed into the Byzantine center, but then Narses ordered his horse archers to attack their exposed rear, effectively encircling them. Unable to counter the maneuver, the Franks were surrounded, and most of Butilinus's army was destroyed.

Despite a few Gothic and Frankish strongholds continuing to resist for several more years, the victory secured Byzantine control of the Italian Peninsula, as it was the last major engagement in the Gothic War.

== Background ==
Following the fall of the Gothic king Teia in the Battle of Mons Lactarius in October 552, the remaining Goths in the Po Valley called upon the Franks for help against the Byzantine armies under Narses. Although King Theudebald refused to send aid, he allowed two of his subjects, the Alemanni chieftains Leutharis and Butilinus, to cross into Italy. According to the contemporary historian Agathias Scholasticus, the two brothers gathered a host of 75,000 Franks and Alemanni, (Note: The sole source for this number is Agathias, which several historians (John B. Bury, Peter Heather, Ilkka Syvänne) take it at face value. John Haldon considers it an exaggeration.) and in early 553 crossed the Alps and took the town of Parma.

Narses exploited his victory at Mons Lactarius by besieging Cumae and at the same time sending detachments to secure the Gothic-held cities of Tuscany, with Florence, Centumcellae, Volaterrae, Luna, and Pisa surrendering. He then learned that the defensive forces he had stationed near the River Po were defeated in the Emilia region. Upon hearing of this news, the other commanders, John the Sanguinary and Artabanes, withdrew their troops to Faventia to be in closer proximity to Ravenna. Narses was displeased by the withdrawal and sent his trusted commander Stephanus to reprimand the other officers and demand their compliance with his orders. Following this episode, Narses continued the siege of Lucca. Later, Narses dispersed his troops to garrisons throughout central Italy with orders to assemble in spring at Rome, and himself wintered at Ravenna. Narses believed that summer was the enemy of the Franks because they were not used to it.

In the spring of 554, the two brothers invaded central Italy, plundering as they descended southwards. Despite some skirmishes, Narses allowed the Frankish forces to pass Rome and head south. At Samnium, they divided their forces, with Butilinus and the larger part of the army marching south towards Campania region and the Strait of Messina. Leutharis led the remainder towards Apulia and Otranto, but soon turned back home, laden with spoils. His vanguard, however, was defeated by Artabanes at Fanum, leaving most of the booty behind. The remainder managed to reach northern Italy and cross the Alps into Frankish territory, but not before losing more men to a plague, including Leutharis himself. (Note: Instead of the plague, historian Ilkka Syvänne considers the possibility that the Byzantines contaminated local food or water supplies.)

Butilinus, on the other hand, more ambitious and possibly persuaded by the Goths to restore their kingdom with himself as king, resolved to remain. His army was infected by dysentery, reducing his army from its original size to 30,000-strong. In autumn 554, Butilinus marched back to Campania and erected a camp on the banks of the Volturnus River, covering its exposed sides with an earthen rampart, reinforced by his numerous supply wagons. A bridge over the river was fortified by a wooden tower, garrisoned by the Franks.

== Battle ==
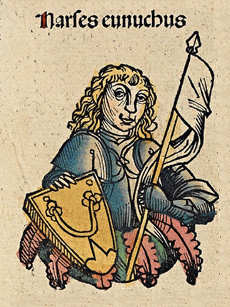
Narses in the Nuremberg Chronicle, 1493

When Narses found out about the location of the Frankish camp, he set forth at the head of an 18,000-strong force, including a contingent of Heruli mercenaries. His army included infantry, heavy cavalry, and horse archers, and was thus at an advantage over the mostly infantry-based Frankish forces. As the Byzantine army approached the Frankish camp, Narses sent an Armenian officer, Charananges, with a cavalry force to cut the Franks' supplies. Charananges captured several of the wagons and used one of them to set fire to the watchtower guarding the bridge. After this first skirmish, both sides exited their camps and formed up for battle.

At that point, an incident affected the battle. A Heruli captain killed a servant, and when confronted by Narses, refused to acknowledge any fault. Narses had him executed, whereupon the rest of the Heruli announced that they refused to fight. Nevertheless, Narses drew up his forces for battle. Faced with the solid and deep-arrayed Frankish infantry, he chose a disposition similar to that of the Battle of Taginae, with the infantry in the center, backed by archers, and the cavalry on the wings. Narses himself took command of the right wing, while Artabanes and Valerian were placed in charge of the left wing. Part of the left wing was also concealed in a wood that grew there. At the pleas of the Heruli general, Sindual, who promised to persuade his men to fight, he left a gap in the middle of the infantry, which the Heruli were to occupy.

Two Heruli had deserted to the Franks and persuaded Butilinus to attack while the Heruli stayed out of the battle. The Franks arrayed in a wedge formation and advanced, smashing into the Byzantine center. They quickly penetrated the gap left by the Heruli, but Narses commanded his cavalry, which included horse archers, to wheel on their flanks and attack the Franks from their exposed rear. The Franks, already engaged with the Byzantine infantry, were unable to turn and face their more mobile enemies in the rear. As confusion started to spread amongst them, the Heruli joined the battle. In the words of J. B. Bury, "... then Sindual and his Heruli appeared upon the scene. The defeat of the Franks was already certain; it was now to be annihilation."

== Aftermath ==
Butilinus and most of his men perished, while Byzantine casualties were small. Agathias gives a low number of 80 Byzantine casualties, while claiming that only five men from Butilinus's army survived. Historian Peter Heather argues that while doubt can be cast on these numbers, he asserts that it was a clear victory for Narses, and signaled the final triumph of the Byzantine Empire in Italy. Despite this victory, the war was not finished. Seven thousand Goths held out at Campsa, near Naples until they capitulated in the spring of 555. The lands and cities across the River Po were still held by Franks and Goths, and it was not until 562 that their last strongholds, the cities of Verona and Brixia, were subjugated.
