= Basolus =

Basolus (Basle) (c.555–c.620) was a French Benedictine and hermit. He was born near Limoges, and then became a monk near Verzy. He spent 40 years as a hermit on a hill near Reims.

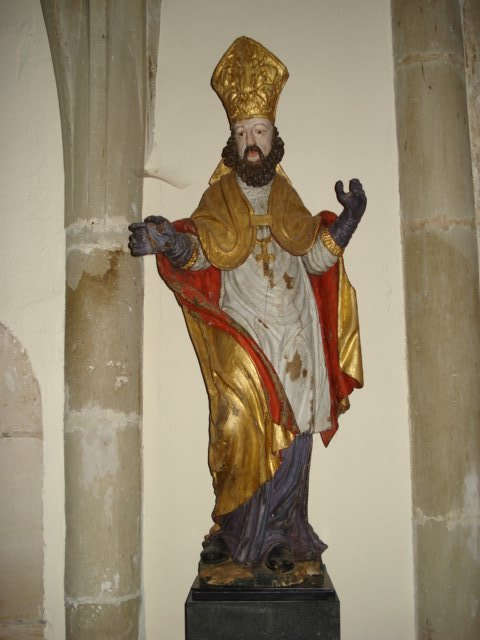
Image of Saint Basle (Church at Vittel)

St-Basle Abbey near Verzy was later named for him. He is a Catholic and Orthodox saint, feast day November 26.
