= Erb of Gwent =

Erb Urbanus
- King of Gwent and Glywysing
- Reign: ? – c. 555
- Predecessor: Erbig
- Successor: Nynnio
- Issue: Peibio Clafrog, Nynnio
- Father: Erbig

King Erb (also, in Latin, Urbanus) (c.524 – c.555) was the king of Gwent and Glywysing, kingdoms in the south of Wales in the Early Middle Ages.

== Life ==
According to later genealogies, Erb was the son of King Meurig ap Caradog's son, Erbig. Nothing is known of his life. After Erb's death in the mid-6th century, his kingdom was divided between his young sons. Nynnio became king of Gwent and Glywysing and Peibio became the ruler of Ergyng.
