= Teia =

Last Ostrogothic King

Teia 𐌸𐌴𐌹𐌰
- King of the Ostrogoths
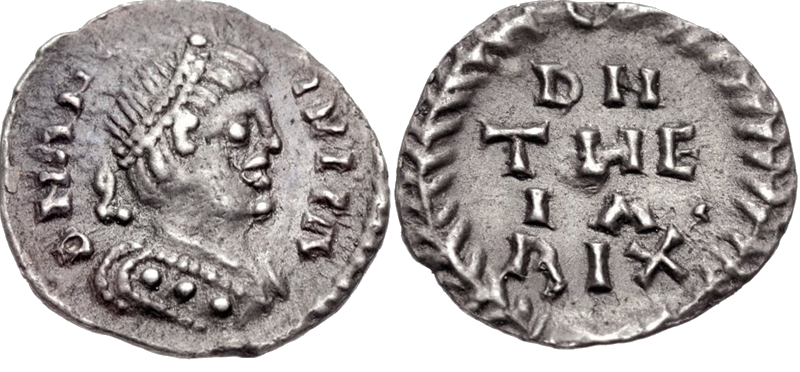
- Quarter siliqua of Teia. Obverse text in Late Latin: D[OMINUS] N[OSTER] THEIA RIX [sic] ("Our lord Teia the King").
- Reign: July 552 – October 552
- Predecessor: Totila
- Died: 1 or 30 October 552

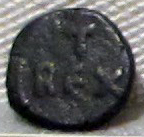
Coin of Teia, merely inscribing: T REX ("Teia the King").

Teia (died 552), also known as Teja, Theia, Thila, Thela, and Teias, was the last king of the Ostrogoths (Goths).

Teia served as the second-in-command under the King Totila during the Gothic resurgence in the Gothic War (535–554) against the Byzantine Empire. Following Totila's death at the Battle of Taginae in July 552, Teia withdrew to Ticinum (modern-day Pavia), the capital of the Gothic Kingdom, where the remaining Goths proclaimed him king. He reorganized the Gothic forces and sought an alliance with the Franks against the Byzantines, but they declined to act. Upon the news that Narses was besieging Cumae, where Teia's brother was a garrison leader and much of Totila's war chest was located, Teia marched to relieve the city. In late summer 552, Teia's army, before reaching Cumae, was intercepted by the Byzantines at the slopes of Mount Vesuvius, where, after a two-month stalemate, he was killed during the battle on the slopes of Mount Lactarius in October 552. The death of Teia marked the end of the Ostrogothic kingdom since no other succeeded him.

== Biography ==
=== Background and military career under Totila ===
Little is known about the early life of Teia, other than he was the elder brother of Aligernus. Teia was a military officer serving under Totila, who was successful in rekindling the Gothic resistance against the Byzantine Empire and within a decade had recovered much of the Italian Peninsula from the Byzantines. Contemporary historian Procopius mentions Teia during the later stages of the war, when Byzantine emperor Justinian I sent his chamberlain (cubicularius), Narses, with an army to conclude the war. Totila sent Teia, along with a 2,000-strong cavalry, to guard the River Po and prevent any crossings by the Byzantines. However, Narses was able to cross the river and avoid any engagements with Teia, and swiftly marched south toward Rome. Totila recalled Teia as he was compelled to intercept Narses' army. The two armies engaged in the Battle of Taginae in July 552, right after the reinforcements led by Teia arrived. The Goths were defeated and Totila was mortally wounded. (Note: From what is known, Totila was trying to escape from the battlefield before suffering a fatal wound.)

=== Reign and death ===
After this defeat, Teia assembled the remaining Gothic forces in Ticinum (modern-day Pavia), where they chose him as their king. At Ticinum, Teia took possession of the available treasury to continue the war. Teia encouraged his erstwhile Frankish neighbors to mobilize themselves against the Byzantines. However, the Franks refused, preferring to let the Goths and Byzantines wear each other down, thereby easing their eventual conquest of Italy. In the meantime, Narses captured Rome with little resistance. Upon this news, Teia ordered the death of all Roman senators and their families held as hostages in Campania and 300 children of prominent Italian families, whom Totila had collected.

Narses then besieged Cumae, compelling Teia to march south to relieve the city, as it held Totila's war chest and his brother was the garrison leader. To avoid contact with Byzantine forces, Teia made several lengthy detours during his advance, which took nearly thirty days of marching. Historian JB Bury argues that Teia anticipated that the land routes to Cumae, north of Naples, would be guarded, and he probably intended to embark his troops near Sorrento and reach Cumae by sea using the Gothic supply fleet. However, Narses learned of his movements and intercepted the Gothic army near Mount Vesuvius (because of the route Teia chose), blocking its path to Cumae. At the time, Narses did not have a fleet to confront the Gothic navy or prevent the resupply of the opposing army, but was able to prevent such a transport taking place.

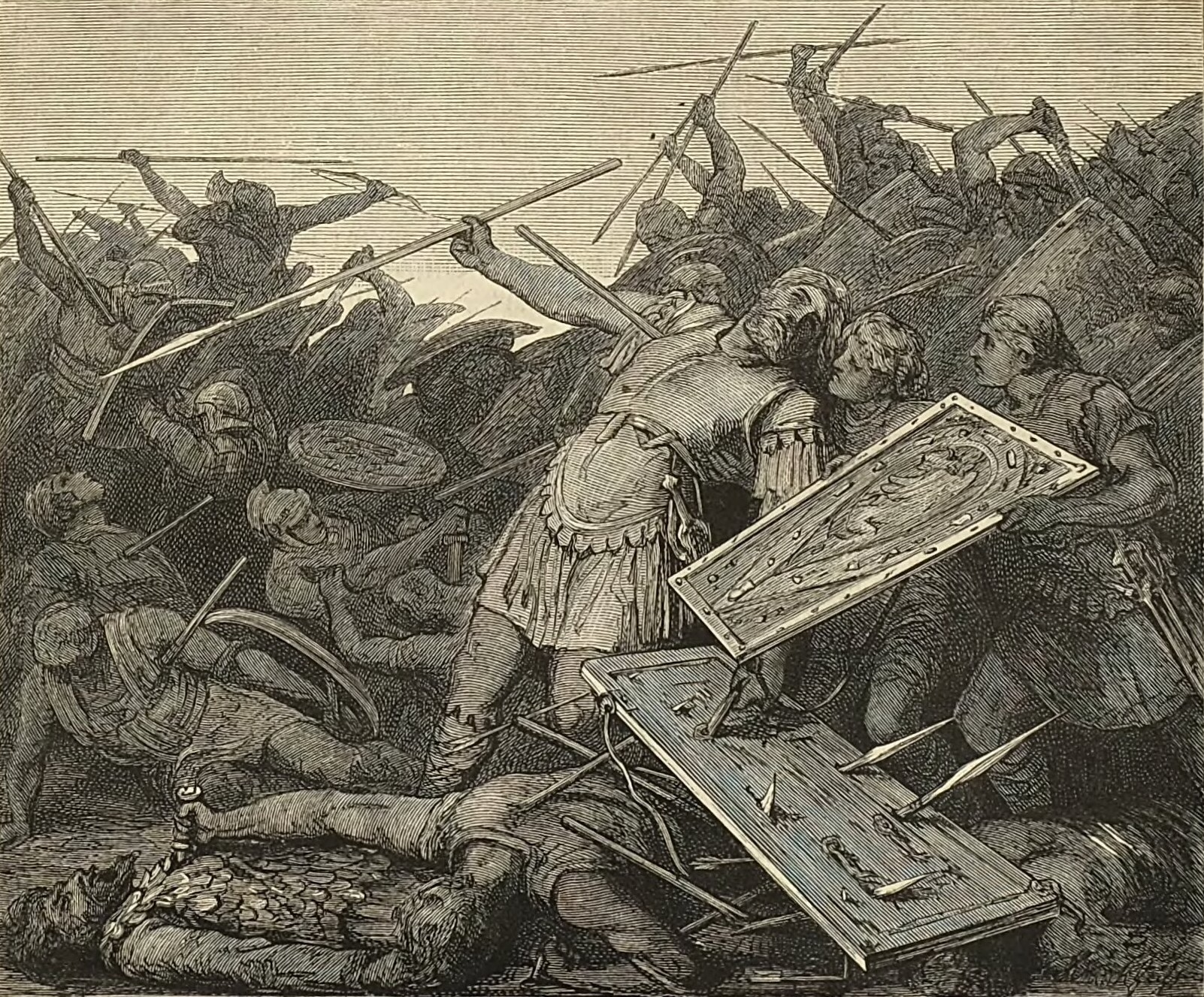
The death of Teia during the Battle of Mons Lactarius by Hermann Knackfuss c. 1871

Upon arriving, Teia established his forces near Pompeii at the foot of Mount Vesuvius, facing the Byzantines across the Sarno River. The Goths fortified the only bridge with towers and ballistas. The two armies remained in a two-month stalemate marked by minor skirmishes. The deadlock ended when the Gothic admiral defected upon the news of an approaching Byzantine navy, cutting off Gothic supplies, forcing Teia to act before his army faced starvation. Teia withdrew to Mount Lactarius, drawing the Byzantines into difficult terrain. On 1 or 30 October, the Goths launched a surprise attack. There is a disagreement in the sources regarding the date of the battle. Bury notes that this disagreement concerns the date of 1 October provided by the eighth-century historian Andreas Agnellus in his work Liber Pontificalis. Bury considers that Teia arrived in Campania at the end of August and not earlier, and thus if the two armies spent two months at a standstill according to Procopius then Agnellus's date is probably wrong. Historian Ilkka Syvänne considers both dates. Both armies fought on foot in phalanx formations. Teia personally led repeated assaults to break the Byzantine infantry lines. Byzantine soldiers tried to kill Teia by throwing spears while his companions continually replaced his shattered shields. Eventually, a spear killed Teia, sparking a fierce battle over his body. The Byzantines captured Teia's body and displayed his head on a spear to demoralize the Goths, yet the Goths continued fighting for two more days. Historian Guy Halsall called this battle a "cataclysmic showdown." Procopius wrote of Teia during this conflagration: "Here shall be described a battle of great note and the heroism of one man inferior, I think, to that of none of the heroes of legend, that, namely, which Teias displayed in the present battle." Finally, the remaining Goths negotiated a withdrawal from Italy, retaining their money for travel. Narses accepted the surrender under the condition that the Goths leave Italy (according to Procopius), or remain loyal subjects of the Byzantine Empire (according to contemporary historian Agathias).

== Aftermath ==
The defeat at Mons Lactarius marked the end of Gothic resistance, and Procopius's narrative of the Gothic War. By 554, after twenty years of protracted war, the Ostrogothic Kingdom had faded into obscurity, and the Gothic people who remained began assimilating into the broader Italian population. Meanwhile, Justinian reasserted power across Italy by imposing his tax system and his Corpus along with other Byzantine legislation, with central power resting in Constantinople. Although his reign was brief, silver coins minted in Teia's name circulated all the way from his capital at Pavia along the Alpine trade routes into Transalpine Gaul.

== See also ==
Regnal titles
Preceded by Totila	King of the Ostrogoths; July 552–October 552
