= Aligern =

- Other name: Aligernus
- Occupation: military leader

Aligern or Aligernus was an Ostrogoth military leader, active in the Gothic War (535-554). By the end of the war, Aligern had joined the Byzantine army. The main sources about him are Procopius and Agathias.

== Biography ==
Agathias describes Aligern as the son of Fredigernus (Fritigern) and younger brother of Teia, king of the Ostrogoths (r. 552-553). Procopius considers Aligern to be a brother of Totila (r. 541-552). This is probably an error, since Aligern could not be a brother to both monarchs. Modern historians consider Agathias more reliable on the matter.

He is first mentioned, unnamed, in 552 by Procopius. Totila appointed Herodianus and Aligern as joined commanders over the city of Cumae. What happened to Herodianus is uncertain. Aligern is mentioned defending the city to c. 554, following the deaths of both Totila and Teia. Agathias explains Aligern's continued defiance by pointing to the strong defensive position of the city and an apparent "abundance of supplies". During a Byzantine siege of the city, Aligern is recorded killing Palladius.

The situation changed when the Franks invaded the Italian Peninsula. The new threat convinced Aligern to surrender the city in late 553 or early 554. He visited Narses, the Byzantine commander in Italy, to deliver the keys to the city. Narses immediately sent Aligern to Caesena, for a first encounter with the Franks. His attempt to discourage the Franks from marching against Cumae failed.

In October 554, Aligern fought on the Byzantine side at the Battle of the Volturnus, a decisive Byzantine victory. Nothing further is known of him after that.

== Sources ==
- Bury, John Bagnell (1958) [1923], History of the Later Roman Empire: From the Death of Theodosius I to the Death of Justinian, Volume 2, Mineola, New York: Dover Publications, OCLC 41478187
- Martindale, John R., ed. (1992). The Prosopography of the Later Roman Empire: Volume III, AD 527–641. Cambridge: Cambridge University Press. ISBN 0-521-20160-8.
