= Monti Lattari =

Mountain range in Italy

Coordinates: 40°39′N 14°30′E

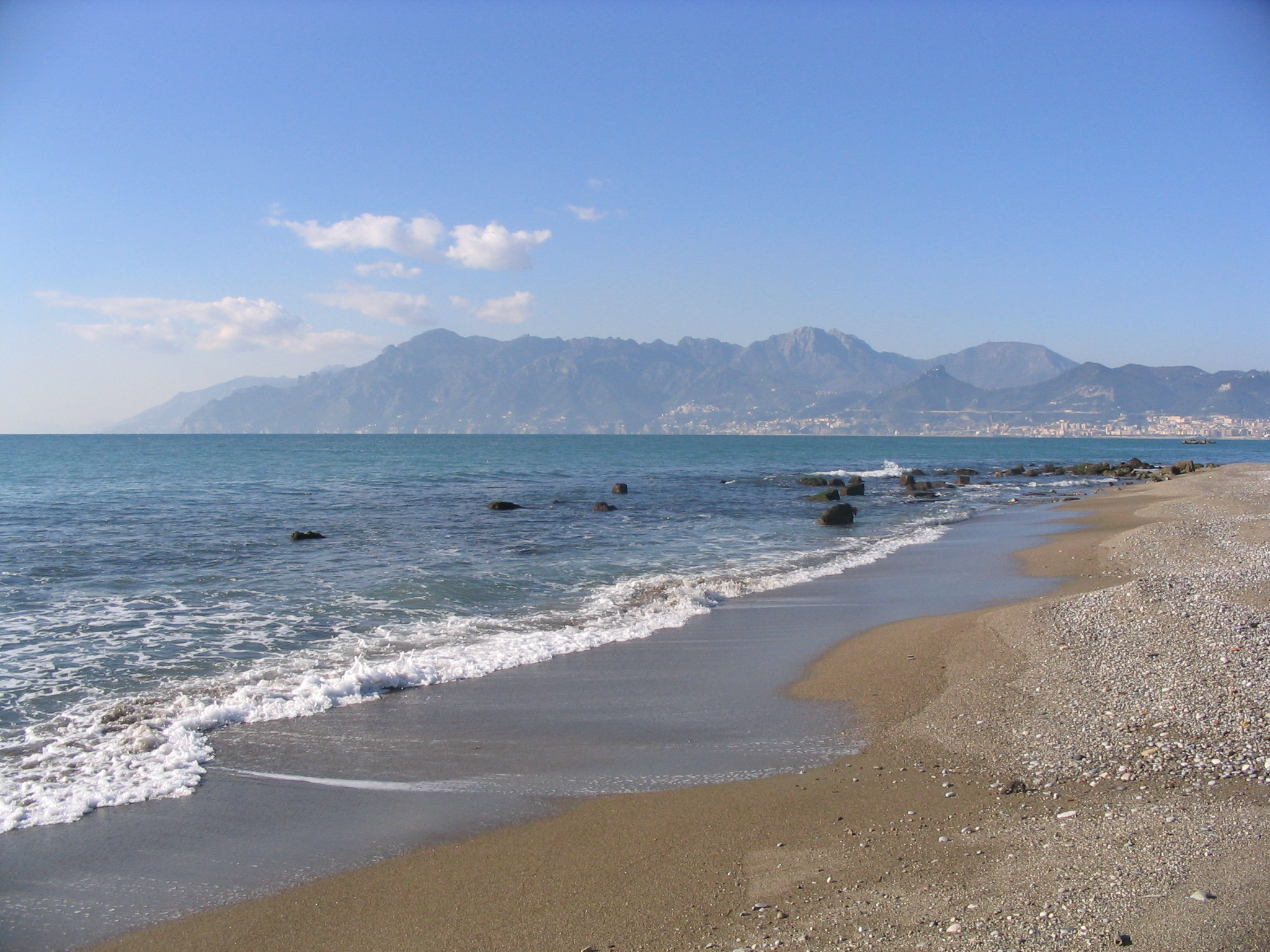
View of the Monti Lattari from the Gulf of Salerno.

The Monti Lattari (Lattari Mountains) are a mountain range in Campania, southern Italy, which constitutes the backbone of the Sorrentine peninsula and of the Amalfi Coast.

== Geography ==
The Monti Lattari are the western extension of the Monti Picentini in the Campanian Apennines, stretching into the Tyrrhenian Sea to form the Sorrentine peninsula. The name derives from the flocks of goats grazing in the area, which provide a good quality of milk (lactis in Latin).

The range is bounded from north-west by the Gulf of Naples, from north by the Sarno river plain, from east by the Metelliana plain of Cava de' Tirreni, and from south by the Gulf of Salerno. The rocks are of limestone formation, reaching their highest altitude at 1,444 m with the Monte San Michele. To the north is the popular Monte Faito, reachable by cable car from Castellammare di Stabia.
