= Narses =

6th-century Byzantine general

- Latin: Narses; Greek: Ναρσής; Armenian: Նարսես/Ներսէս
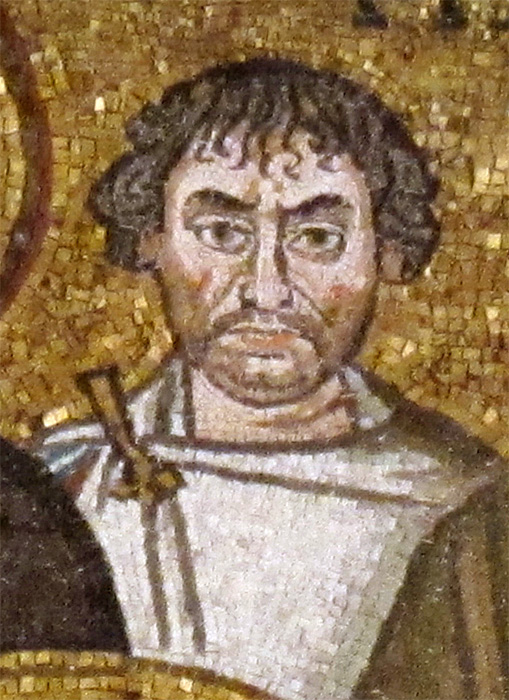
- Mosaic from the Basilica of San Vitale, often attributed to Narses, though definitive identification is uncertain due to limited historical evidence.
- Born: 478 or 480
- Died: 566 or 573 (aged 86–95)
- Military career
- Allegiance: Eastern Roman Empire
- Branch: Eastern Roman army
- Rank: General
- Conflicts: Nika Rebellion Gothic War: Battle of Taginae; Battle of Mons Lactarius; Battle of the Volturnus

Narses (Latin: Narses, also spelled Nerses; Latin pronunciation: [ˈnarseːs]; Armenian: Ներսէս; Greek: Ναρσής; c. 478–573) was a distinguished Roman general and statesman of Armenian heritage, renowned for his critical role in Emperor Justinian I's military campaigns. Alongside the famed Belisarius, Narses was instrumental in the reconquest of Italy during the Gothic War (535–554), which sought to restore the western provinces of the Roman Empire.

Narses first gained significant recognition by suppressing the Nika riots in 532, using his diplomatic skills and wealth to help quell the revolt. His later campaigns in Italy were marked by decisive victories, most notably at the Battle of Taginae in 552, where he defeated the Ostrogothic king Totila, and at the Battle of Mons Lactarius in 553, effectively ending the Ostrogothic kingdom.

== Origins ==
Narses was born in Persarmenia, the eastern region of Armenia ceded to the Sasanian Empire under the Peace of Acilisene around AD 387. He was of Armenian heritage, part of a substantial Armenian population that played a prominent role within the Byzantine Empire.

Some sources have mistakenly conflated Narses (who was a eunuch) with Narses of the Kamsarakan family, a noble Armenian lineage. However, scholarly consensus now holds that the general had no verifiable ties to this princely house. His first appearance in historical records is by Procopius around AD 530, in connection with the Byzantine–Sasanian conflicts.

The exact year of Narses' birth is uncertain, with dates typically cited as 478, 479, or 480. His death date is also debated, estimated between 566 and 574, suggesting he lived to an age of between eighty-six and ninety-six years. Details of his family background, early life, and the circumstances of his castration remain obscure, often shrouded in speculation and legend.

The historian Agathias Scholasticus of Myrina offered a vivid description of Narses: "He was a man of sound mind, and clever at adapting himself to the times. He was not versed in literature nor practiced in oratory, [but] made up for it by the fertility of his wits." Physically, Agathias noted he was "small and of a lean habit, but stronger and more high-spirited than would have been believed."

== Religion ==
Narses was reported to be a very pious man with a special devotion to the Virgin Mary. Evagrius Scholasticus in Ecclesiastica Historia reported that she would tell him the proper time to attack, and Narses would never engage in battle without her consent. Narses also was reported to be generous to the poor and zealous when it came to restoring churches. He was so devoted to prayers and vigils that "he obtained victory more by the supplications he poured forth to God, than by arms of war." Before accepting supreme command of the army, Narses built a church and monastery in Cappadocia, intent upon going there upon his retirement. Paul the Deacon, a late 8th century Lombard writer, insisted that Narses was a Catholic, but John of Ephesus, a Miaphysite contemporary of Narses, wrote that Narses staffed his monastery with exiled Miaphysite monks.

== Early career ==
How or when Narses arrived in Constantinople, or exactly how he found a footing in the officium of the Grand Chamberlain, remains unknown. When Procopius first mentions Narses, he was serving as Emperor Justinian I's steward (cubicularius) in 530. Narses was also a high treasurer who dealt with the emperor's finances and payments from the imperial treasury, probably holding the post of sacellarius. He rose through the ranks, became the commander of the emperor's eunuch bodyguard (spatharius) c. 532, and eventually became Grand Chamberlain (praepositus sacri cubiculi) around 537/538. Despite his later military commands, he is never attested as Master of Soldiers (magister militum) in formal documents. Narses became a patrician in the 550s. Although Theodosius II was alleged to have, in 422, barred eunuchs from serving as patricians, Justinian overturned this law.

== Nika riots ==
Narses played a crucial role in suppressing the Nika riots of 532, the largest uprising in the history of Byzantium and Constantinople. The revolt began during chariot races at the Imperial Hippodrome, when longstanding tensions erupted into mass protests. Initially, the rebels demanded the abdication of Emperor Justinian I, and the disorder escalated into widespread violence that left much of the city in ruins. Facing the threat of losing his throne, Justinian considered fleeing, but Empress Theodora persuaded him to stay and resist.

Narses was entrusted with a large sum of gold and instructed to infiltrate the Blue faction’s camp. Unarmed and accompanied by only a few attendants, he approached the Blues’ section of the Hippodrome and, risking his life, skillfully distributed bribes. Narses convinced many influential senators and Blue leaders that supporting Hypatius, who had been declared emperor by the rebels, was not in their best interest. Following this intervention, the senators and many Blues, chanting “Justiniane Auguste, tu vincas!” (“Justinian Augustus, may you triumph!”), abandoned the rebellion, significantly weakening its leadership.

Shortly afterward, a detachment of the Armenian corps led by John the Armenian entered the city, soon joined by Herulian infantry. Justinian then ordered a decisive assault on the remaining rebels. Generals Belisarius, John the Armenian, and Mund, with their loyal troops, stormed the Hippodrome and carried out a brutal massacre, while Narses and his detachment surrounded the Hippodrome, preventing escape. Contemporary sources report that around 35,000 people were killed in the Hippodrome and its surroundings.

The crushing of the Nika revolt marked a turning point, solidifying the inner circle of Justinian and Theodora, with Narses becoming a key figure. In gratitude for his loyalty and service, Justinian promoted him to the senatorial rank of vir illustris, and in 538, Narses was appointed praepositus sacri cubiculi, effectively serving as the emperor’s chief chamberlain and close advisor. This position made Narses one of the most influential and trusted individuals in the Byzantine Empire.

== Military career ==
Narses' involvement and help in suppressing the Nika Riots suddenly found him in charge of a moderately-sized army that would go to Italy to help Belisarius. The army arrived in June of 538 probably in Ancona and consisted of roughly 7,000 soldiers. (Every army that Narses commanded was made up of very diverse peoples, drawing from many of the surrounding tribes.) Procopius referred to Narses as the eunuch and keeper of the royal treasuries, and described him as "keen and more energetic than would be expected of a eunuch". Narses met with Belisarius at Firmum where a council of war was held. The council discussed what should happen regarding the Siege of Ariminum and with the commander of troops, John, who was a close friend of Narses. Narses commented that he had already been punished for his "insolence" and that if the Goths took Rimini then it could turn the tide of the war. Belisarius and Narses led a column of troops through inland mountainous routes to descend upon Rimini from the northwest.

John owed his thanks to Narses for convincing Belisarius, and according to Procopius, commented on the relationship between the two men. "And from that time both these men [Belisarius and Narses] began to regard each other with great suspicion." During the autumn and winter months of 538–39, the Army in Italy was divided into two parties, between Belisarius and Narses. Justinian himself dispatched a letter to Belisarius, stating that "We have not sent our steward Narses to Italy in order to command the army; for we wish Belisarius alone to command the whole army in whatever manner seems to him best, and it is the duty of all of you to follow him in the interest of the state." The division however remained and the city of Milan was to fall victim to the divided command. Narses was recalled to Constantinople, but not in disgrace, as he was allowed to retain some of his barbarian guardsmen.

After being recalled, Narses seemed to have lost "none of his favour at court, [and] remained the most trusted servant and minister of the Emperor and his consort." In 541, Narses was believed to have helped the Empress Theodora and Antonina (wife of Belisarius) with the overthrow of John the Cappadocian. In late 541 or early 542, Narses was sent by Justinian to investigate popular disturbances near the Golden Gate of Constantinople. He received a report that a prophetess' foretelling of deadly floods had agitated the crowds. In 545, Justinian sent Narses to the rulers of the Heruli to recruit troops to join Belisarius in Italy. When the Heruli troops were accompanying Narses to Thrace, they unexpectedly encountered and defeated the Sclaveni raiders.

== Return to Italy ==
Finally in 551, Narses was sent back to Italy, where he was to achieve his greatest victories. Germanus, a cousin of the Emperor, was appointed by Justinian to finish what Belisarius had started a decade before. However, on his way to Italy in 550, Germanus fell ill and "abruptly reached the term of life." Narses was appointed the new commander of the army, given supreme command and returned to Italy where twelve years previously he had been recalled. Many historians believe that Narses was put in command because of his old age, so that he would never be able to rebel successfully against Justinian.

Narses' greatest asset in his newfound position was to have access to the Emperor's financial resources. With the treasury, Narses was able to amass anywhere between 20,000 and 30,000 troops. Narses also seemed to be well liked by many of the soldiers of fortune, as he had treated them "especially well". Procopius reported that Narses had built an army that in the requirement of men and arms was "worthy of the Roman Empire". The army reflected many of Narses' previous commands, in that most of the troops were barbarians.

Narses was to take more than a year to reach Italy after his appointment, as his entire army made a long march along the coast of the Adriatic Sea. Totila the Ostrogothic king controlled the sea of eastern Italy and hampered supply ships that set sail for Narses' army. John from Salona led 38 ships and Valerian sailed with 12 to meet Totila's force and bring relief to Ancona. Procopius described the subsequent Battle of Sena Gallica as a naval battle that resembled a battle on land. "There were arrows discharged and fighting at close quarters with sword and spear, just as on a battle field." The Byzantine victory at Sena Gallica was overwhelming, as 36 of the 47 Gothic ships were destroyed, and Gibal, a Gothic admiral, was captured. Historian Archibald R. Lewis pointed out that victory could only come to Narses after Totila's sea dominance was brought to an end.

There were a number of reasons that Narses' march was very slow. Totila had dispatched various troops to employ delaying tactics and the Franks were enemies of Narses' allies the Lombards, and did not allow free passage. Procopius stated that Narses was "completely bewildered", but John was familiar with that part of Italy and advised him how to continue. Using this advice, Narses was able to reach Ravenna unopposed. Totila may have believed that Narses was going to come from the sea, whence all the previous invasions had come.

== Battle of Taginae ==
On his way to seek Totila's main army, Narses encountered a small Gothic garrison at the town of Rimini. John, who had previously been in command at Rimini when it was besieged by Gothic forces, again gave advice to Narses on how to proceed. The exact route taken was not precisely indicated by Procopius and has led to confusion on the reconstruction of the coming battles. Procopius referred to the next battle as "Busta Gallorum", but many historians now refer to it as the Battle of Taginae.

Narses sent word to Totila and gave him a chance to either surrender, or give the day in which the battle would take place. Procopius quoted Totila's response, "At the end of eight days let us match our strength." Narses was not fooled by this and preferred the tactical defensive upon meeting Totila, as his army would have been larger than that of Totila. The following battle would be Narses' ultimate victory, and would set the estimation of his military talents as not inferior to those of Belisarius.

=== Tactics ===
Narses' great success at the Battle of Taginae was to come from the disposition of his forces before the battle began. Narses arrayed his troops in a "crescent shaped" formation with mostly infantry in the middle, flanked by archers. The infantry were in fact dismounted barbarian cavalry, since many of the Goths thought that typical infantry was frail and would flee in the face of a charge. Some historians feel there may have been a political motivation by placing the Heruli and Lombards in the centre dismounted, Narses possibly suspecting them of having sympathy or admiration for Totila.

On the sides of the crescent, foot-archers were placed, and this enabled them to destroy the Gothic cavalry through enfilading fire. (This disposition of the archers and their effect upon the battle is strikingly parallel to the later Battle of Agincourt.) Next, Narses placed much of his cavalry on the immediate sides of the dismounted infantry. Normally the cavalry would have been behind the centre, but they were not meant to aid any of the struggling line. Instead they were used to deliver a surprise attack on the Goths when they became fully enveloped. Narses knew that Totila would take the advantage of attacking the "weak" centre, and therefore allowed Narses to completely destroy the Ostrogothic army. Procopius said that Totila had been "out-generalled by his own folly", because Totila had instructed his troops to only engage with spears, as he thought a quick strike would win the battle.

Totila sent wave after wave of troops, who became so disorganized by the raining arrow storm that by the time they met the dismounted infantrymen they were completely broken. The Gothic infantry never even engaged in actual combat as they hesitated to advance far enough to actually become effective. They were kept in the rear of the advance, fearing that Narses' horsemen would outflank them from the hill. Finally, Totila's cavalry was pressed backwards onto their own line of infantry, Narses then charged with his own cavalry, which had been held in reserve. The retreat quickly turned into a rout, as the Gothic cavalry rushed right over the infantry, who joined them in the withdrawal.

Totila himself was killed at this battle and Procopius gave two versions as to the fate of the Ostrogothic king. The first has Totila initially surviving the battle and fleeing the field of battle with only five of his followers. Asbad, leader of the Gepids, overtook him and drove his spear into Totila. The body was immediately taken to the village of Caprae where it was hurriedly buried. In the second version, Totila was mortally wounded in the first wave, struck by a bowman who did not even recognize his target. The first is more widely accepted by historians, as later a Gothic woman revealed where Totila was buried and the body was exhumed and positively identified.

== Rome ==
Narses marched to Rome after the Battle of Taginae and had to conduct a short siege of the city. Narses attacked on one side with a large contingent of archers, while John assaulted another part of the walls. From Rome, Narses would work to remove all of the remaining Ostrogothic forces from Italy. The next major move that Narses undertook was to capture the treasury of Totila that was held in Cumae. Both Procopius and Agathias wrote of the strength of the fortress at Cumae. Procopius called it, "an exceedingly strong fortress," and Agathias declared it "very well fortified."

As parts of the army were sent throughout the country to deal with Teias (the son of Totila, and new Gothic king), a considerable detachment was sent to Campania to take Cumae. Teias followed the example set by Narses on his march into Italy and marched around the Imperial Army. After engaging Narses in small skirmishes for nearly two months, Teias retreated into the mountains. They maneuvered onto Mons Lactarius, where they soon faced death from starvation.

== Battle of Mons Lactarius ==
The Goths suddenly came down the mountain in a compact phalanx, catching the army off guard who were also on foot. The reasons why the Goths attacked horseless is unknown, but the suddenness of the attack seemed to be the reason that Narses fought horseless as well. The ensuing battle was fought for two days and Procopius described the bravery of King Teias. He first introduced the battle as "a battle of great note," and the heroism displayed by King Teias was not "inferior to any of the heroes of legend." It may be noted that Procopius did not witness any of the battle, and only retold it from the account of others.

Teias led the charge towards Narses. Procopius recounts that every time his shield was filled with arrows, he received another from his man-at-arms. Finally when a spear struck his shield, he received another but was struck with a mortal blow. The soldier cut off his head to display to the Goths that their king had died, but instead of disheartening the Goths, it reinvigorated them to fight for another day. The second day was much like the first, as the Goths charged and fought on foot, involving little to no tactics. Finally, the Goths sent some of their officers to Narses who said they would surrender if they were allowed to leave the country safely. Narses, who received more advice from John, accepted those terms of surrender.

== Final battles ==
After the final defeat of the Goths, the Franks, led by the brothers Leutharis and Buccillinus, attempted to invade the recently reconquered lands. From the Liber Pontificalis: "They (The Franks) in like manner wasted Italy. But with the help of the Lord they too were destroyed by Narses. And all Italy rejoiced." For the next year or two, Narses crossed the countryside, reinstituting Byzantine rule and laying siege to towns that resisted. But as more and more Franks poured over the Alps, Narses regrouped in Rome, and once spring came, marched his army against them. The Franks, led by the two brothers, were pursuing separate routes, but plundering the whole time.

At the Battle of Casilinum, Narses put true heavy infantry in the centre, instead of dismounted cavalry. These were hand picked troops, "Ante-signani", who wore long clad coats of mail that went down to their feet. Highly trained cavalry were on the flanks, armed with everything that the army carried. On the opposing side, Agathias describes the Franks as, "Very rude and without cavalry. Their swords were worn on the left leg, and their main weapons were the throwing ax and hooked javelins." The Franks attacked Narses' centre, which was initially pushed back but was reinforced by the Heruli, who slowed the attackers.

At this point Narses had the cavalry wheel in from the flanks, but without directly engaging the Franks. Instead, he had them unleash an enormous number of arrows into the half-naked barbarians. Finally the Franks became disorganized and their tightly held formations broke down. Narses sounded a general charge that blasted their ranks, and mowed them down. The Franks were massacred and Agathias claimed that only five of them escaped from Narses that day. All three of Narses' major victories can be credited to his skillful use of combined tactics involving cavalry and archers to create and exploit disorder in his enemies. Afterwards, in the autumn of 554, the triumphant Narses returned to Rome, possibly to celebrate a formal Triumph; but Agathias, the sole source for the possibility, "does not provide even a rhetorical account of this", and gives no further detail.

== Final years ==
For the next twelve years, Narses may have stayed in Italy and "set about to reorganize" its government. Justinian sent Narses a series of new decrees known as "pragmatic sanctions". Many historians refer to Narses in this part of his career as an Exarch. Narses completed some restoration projects in Italy but was unable to return Rome to its former splendor, though he did repair many of the bridges into the city and rebuilt the city's walls.

Little is known of Narses' last years. Some historians believe he died in 567, while others assert that he died in 574, in which case he may have reached the age of 96.

Legend has it that Narses was recalled to Constantinople for turning the Romans under his rule into virtual slaves, thereby upsetting the new Emperor Justin II and his wife, the Empress Sophia. Narses then retired to Naples. In an apocryphal but often retold story, Sophia sent Narses a golden distaff with the sarcastic message that he was invited to return to the palace and oversee the women's spinning, and Narses is said to have replied that he would spin a thread of which neither she nor Justin would ever find the end. From Naples, Narses supposedly sent word to the Lombards inviting them to invade northern Italy.

The historian Dunlap questions whether there was hostility between the empress and Narses. Paul the Deacon wrote that his body was returned to Constantinople; his peaceful retirement contradicts the story that he had invited the Lombards into Italy. John of Ephesus wrote that Narses was buried in the presence of the Emperor and Empress in a Bithynian monastery founded by him.

== In fiction ==
Narses is portrayed by Michael Dunn in the 1968 film The Last Roman.
