= 490s =

Decade

The 490s decade ran from January 1, 490, to December 31, 499.

== Events ==
=== By place ===
==== Europe ====
- Spring – Odoacer receives reinforcements from the south and leaves Ravenna. He defeats the Ostrogoths near Faenza.
- King Theodoric the Great retreats to Ticinum (modern Pavia), where he constructs a fortified camp, which is blockaded.
- Summer – The Burgundians, under King Gundobad, cross the Alps and plunder Liguria. Many Romans are taken into captivity.
- King Alaric II supports Theodoric in his conquest of Italy, by dispatching a Visigoth army to raise Odoacer's siege of Pavia.
- August 11 – Battle of the Adda River: Theodoric and his ally Alaric II defeat the forces of Odoacer, on the Adda River, near Milan.
- Theodoric and his Ostrogoths lay siege to Ravenna. The cities of Cesena and Rimini retain their allegiance to Odoacer.

==== Asia ====
- Empress Feng of the Chinese Northern Wei Dynasty dies. She is buried with magnificent honors, in the Wenming Tomb.
- In Jiaozhou, a state official Phục Đăng Chi launched a coup d'etat against the governor Phòng Pháp Thặng and captured him. In November, emperor Wu appointed Phục Đăng Chi as the new Jiaozhou's governor.

=== By topic ===
==== Religion ====
- Euphemius becomes patriarch of Constantinople.

=== By place ===
==== Byzantine Empire ====
- April 9 – Emperor Zeno, age 66, dies of dysentery (or of epilepsy) after a 17-year reign. He has no sons to succeed him and Anastasius, palace official (silentiarius) and favoured friend of empress Ariadne, is elevated to the throne.
- May 20 – Anastasius I marries Ariadne shortly after his accession. His reign is disturbed by religious distractions and a civil war started by Longinus, brother of late emperor Zeno.
- Anti-Isaurian riots break out in the Hippodrome at Constantinople. Longinus and several other Isaurians, including general Longinus of Cardala, are exiled to Thebaid (Egypt).

==== Britannia ====
- Aelle of Sussex besieges and conquers the fortified town Anderitum in southern Britain. He massacres the population, apparently sub-Roman Brythons (according to the Anglo-Saxon Chronicle).

==== Europe ====
- July 9 – Odoacer makes a night assault with his Heruli guardsmen, engaging Theodoric the Great in Ad Pinetam. Both sides suffer heavy losses, but in the end Theodoric repulses the attack, forcing Odoacer back into Ravenna.

==== Asia ====
- Munjamyeong becomes ruler of the Korean kingdom of Goguryeo.

=== By topic ===
==== Religion ====
- Lupicinus becomes bishop of Lyon. He is the founder of the abbeys of Saint Claude (Jura Mountains).

=== By place ===
==== Byzantine Empire ====
- Isaurian War: The Isaurians begin a revolt against Emperor Anastasius I in southern Central Anatolia.
- Battle of Cotyaeum: The Isaurian rebels are defeated by the Eastern Roman army, under John the Scythian and John the Hunchback (subordinate commanders include the future Justin I). They retreat to their mountain fortresses, and continue guerrilla warfare against the Roman forces until 497.

==== Europe ====
- King Theoderic the Great conquers Rimini, and brings his Ostrogoth fleet to blockade the harbours 6 miles from the capital of Ravenna. Important provisions, food and supplies are cut off, and the inhabitants are starved to death.

=== By topic ===
==== Religion ====
- March 1 – Pope Felix III dies after a 9-year reign in which he has excommunicated Patriarch Acacius of Constantinople, thus dividing the Western Church and Eastern Church (Acacian schism). He is succeeded by Gelasius I as the 49th pope.

=== By place ===
==== Byzantine Empire ====
- Isaurian War: Claudiopolis, ancient city of Cappadocia, is besieged and captured by the Romans. The Isaurians blockade the mountain passes, but John the Hunchback (John Gibbo) wins an overwhelming victory against the rebels.

==== Ireland ====
- March – Battle for the Body of St. Patrick: The Uí Néill Dynasty fights over the body of Saint Patrick with the Airgialla Kingdom (according to the Annals of the Four Masters).

==== Europe ====
- February 25 – Odoacer surrenders Ravenna after a 3-year siege, and agrees to a mediated peace with Theodoric the Great, who steadily consolidates his rule and provides security for the local population. His achievement is to manage the transformation of Italy from being the center of a fractured Roman Empire to a successful and independent Ostrogothic Kingdom.
- Onoulphus, brother of Odoacer, is killed during the siege of Ravenna by archers while seeking refuge in a church.
- March 15 – Odoacer is invited to a banquet organised in order to celebrate the peace treaty. During the festivities, Odoacer is killed by Theodoric the Great. His body is skillfully sliced in half in full view of his guests. A massacre of Odoacer's soldiers and supporters follows.
- Theodoric the Great allies with the Franks and marries Audofleda, sister of Clovis I. He also marries his own female relatives to princes or kings of the Burgundians, Vandals and Visigoths, establishing a political alliance with the Germanic kingdoms in the West.
- Clovis I marries the Burgundian princess Clotilde, age 18; she is brought up in the Catholic faith and is the daughter of King Chilperic II. Her father is murdered in the same year by his brother Gundobad.

==== China ====
- Emperor Xiao Wen Di starts adopting a sinicization policy as well as various reforms. He marries Feng Qing, who becomes empress of the Northern Wei Dynasty.

=== By topic ===
==== Religion ====
- Mor Hananyo Monastery is established by Mor Shlemon, converting a former Roman fortress (ex temple) in the Tur Abdin region on the Turkish/Syrian border.

=== By place ===
==== Byzantine Empire ====
- An earthquake devastates the port town of Latakia (modern Syria).

==== China ====
- Emperor Xiao Wen Di moves the capital of Northern Wei from Datong to Luoyang. He makes Chinese the official language of his court, and orders his nobility to adopt Chinese names.

=== By topic ===
==== Religion ====
- Gelasius I delineates the relationship between church and state (Doctrine of the two swords, formulated in his letter Famuli vestrae pietatis to the East Roman Emperor Anastasius I.)
- The Decretum Gelasianum is attributed.
- Gelasius I canonizes Saint George.

=== By place ===
==== Britannia ====
- Cerdic of Wessex and his son, Cynric, land somewhere on the south coast, probably near the Hampshire-Dorset border. Their followers establish the beginnings of the Kingdom of Wessex.

==== China ====
- Emperor Xiao Wen Di of Northern Wei builds the Shaolin Monastery in Henan for the monk Batuo (for alternate founding date see 477 or 497).

=== By topic ===
==== Religion ====
- Pope Gelasius I gains support from Italian bishops, in his assertion that the spiritual power of the papacy is superior to the emperor's temporal authority. Like his predecessors, the pope opposes the Byzantine emperor Anastasius I's efforts to establish Miaphysite doctrine.

=== By place ===
==== Byzantine Empire ====
- Emperor Anastasius I has Euphemius, patriarch of Constantinople, deposed and excommunicated. He appoints Macedonius II as his successor. Euphemius is sent into exile.

==== Europe ====
- Battle of Tolbiac: King Clovis I defeats the Alamanni at Zülpich (Germany). Gibuld, last king of the Alamanni, is killed in battle and the territory is incorporated into the Frankish Kingdom.
- December 25 – Clovis I is baptized into the Catholic faith at Rheims, by Saint Remigius. The conversion strengthens the bonds between his Gallo-Roman subjects, led by their Catholic bishops.

==== Africa ====
- Thrasamund succeeds his brother Gunthamund after his death, and becomes king of the Vandals. Under his rule, he resumes the persecution of the Catholics.

==== Asia ====
- King Kavadh I of Persia is deposed and exiled to Susiana by his younger brother Djamasp. He is installed by the nobles to the Sassanid throne.
- Emperor Xiao Wen Di of Northern Wei starts the Sinicization process, by changing his clan name to the Han Chinese surname Yuan.

=== By topic ===
==== Religion ====
- November 21 – Gelasius I dies after a 4-year reign, and is succeeded by the Rome-born Anastasius II as the 50th pope.

=== By place ===
==== Byzantine Empire ====
- Emperor Anastasius I gives formal recognition to the Ostrogoth king Theodoric the Great, as his representative (viceroy) in Italy. He sends the imperial standard to Ravenna. Theodoric respects the agreement and allows Roman citizens within the Ostrogothic Kingdom to be subject to Roman law.
- Isaurian War: Anastasius I regains control of the Isauria region (Asia Minor) and has the rebel leaders executed. Anastasius I pacifies the mountain strongholds of the Isaurians, ending the revolt that they began upon his ascension to the throne 6 years ago.

==== China ====
- The Shaolin Temple (Henan) is founded (according to the Jiaqing Chongxiu Yitongzhi). (For alternate founding date, see 477 or 495).
- Emperor Xiaowen of Northern Wei fought several battles

=== By topic ===
==== Arts and sciences ====
- Aryabhata, Indian astronomer and mathematician, calculates pi (π) as ≈ 62832/20000 = 3.1416, correct to four rounded-off decimal places.

==== Literature ====
- The Ambrosian Iliad, an Illuminated manuscript on vellum, of the Iliad of Homer, is produced in Constantinople (approximate date).

=== By place ===
==== Byzantine Empire ====
- Emperor Anastasius I abolishes the chrysargyron tax throughout the Eastern Roman Empire, before reforming the monetary system, using Greek numerals instead of Roman.

==== Persia ====
- Kavadh I returns from exile with support of 30,000 Hephthalites (White Huns), and again assumes the Sassanid throne. He punishes his opponents and probably his brother Djamasp, who usurped the throne from him.

==== Japan ====
- Prince Buretsu, age 9, succeeds his father Ninken and becomes the 25th emperor.

=== By topic ===
==== Religion ====
- November 19 – Pope Anastasius II dies after a 2-year reign in which he has tried to conciliate followers of Acacius, late patriarch of Constantinople, who was excommunicated by Felix III.
- November 22 – Anastasius is succeeded by Symmachus as the 51st pope, in the official papal selection in the Lateran Palace (Rome). Meanwhile, Antipope Laurentius is elected "pope" in the Basilica di Santa Maria Maggiore, causing a schism.
- Flavian II succeeds Palladius as patriarch of Antioch.

=== By place ===
==== China ====
- April 26 – Emperor Xiaowen of Northern Wei dies of starvation in his capital at Luoyang, after a 27-year reign in which he has Sinicized his tribal relatives (Tuoba clan), created a Chinese-style government and instituted a land-reform program.
- Crown prince Xuan Wu Di, age 16, succeeds his father Xiaowen and becomes emperor of Northern Wei. He appoints his uncle Yuan Xie provincial governor, who serves temporarily as regent to form a new government.

==== Middle East ====
- September – The 499 Nicopolis earthquake takes place in the borders between the regions of Mesopotamia, Pontus, and Roman Armenia. It affects the cities of Nicopolis, Neocaesarea (modern Niksar), Arsamosata, and Abarne, as well as the cultural areas of Anatolia (Asia Minor) and Mesopotamia.

=== By topic ===
==== Religion ====
- March 1 – During a synod in Rome, which is attended by 72 bishops and all of the Roman clergy, Pope Symmachus makes Antipope Laurentius bishop of the diocese of Nocera in Campania.

== Significant people ==
- Abba Afse, Abuna of Ethiopia
- Anastasius II, Pope of the Roman Catholic Church, p. 496–498
- Mar Aqaq-Acace, Patriarch of the Assyrian Church of the East, 484–496
- Arthur, dux bellorum (leader of battles) and King of the Brythons of later legend
- Mar Babai I, Patriarch of the Assyrian Church of the East, 497–503
- Benedict of Nursia, founder of Western Christian monasticism
- Cerdic of Wessex, Saxon invader and future king and founder of the Kingdom of Wessex
- Cynric of Wessex, Saxon invader and future king of Wessex
- Euphemius, Patriarch of Constantinople, 489–495
- Felix II (excluding Antipope Felix II), Pope of the Roman Catholic Church, p. 483–492
- Gelasius I, Pope of the Roman Catholic Church, p. 492–496
- Macedonius II, Patriarch of Constantinople, 495–511
- Symmachus, Pope of the Roman Catholic Church, p. 498–514

== Births ==
490

- May 3 – Kʼan Joy Chitam I, ruler of Palenque (d. 565)
- John Philoponus, Aristotelian commentator and philosopher (d. 570)
- Romanos the Melodist, Syrian poet (approximate date)
- Vigilantia, Byzantine princess (approximate date)

491

- Approximate date - John Malalas, Byzantine chronicler (d. c. 578)

493

- Cerbonius, bishop of Populonia (approximate date)
- Erzhu Rong, general of Northern Wei (d. 530)

494

- Gildas, British historian and priest (approximate date)

495

- Queen Amalasuintha of the Ostrogoths (approximate date)
- King Chlodomer of the Franks (d. 524)
- Finnian of Movilla, Irish bishop (d. 589)
- Guntheuc, queen of Burgundy and the Franks (d. c. 532)
- Husi Chun, general of Northern Wei (d. 537)
- King Theudebert I of Austrasia (approximate date)

496

- Childebert I, king of the Franks (d. 558)
- Erzhu Tianguang, general of Northern Wei (d. 532)
- Gao Huan, general of Northern Wei (d. 547)
- Germain, bishop of Paris (d. 576)
- Imru' al-Qais, was a pre-Islamic Arabian poet and last King of Kinda (d. 565)

497

- Abdul Mutallib, grandfather of Islamic prophet Mohammed (d. 578)
- Cadoc, Welsh abbot, saint (approximate date)
- Chlothar I, king of the Franks (d. 561)
- Wei Jie, Chinese scholar (d. 569)

498

- Jie Min Di, emperor of Northern Wei (d. 532)
- Kevin of Glendalough, Irish abbot and saint (d. 618)

499

- Ingund, queen of the Franks (approximate date)
- Ly Thien Bao, emperor of Vietnam (d. 555)
- Maximianus, bishop of Ravenna (d. 556)

== Deaths ==
490

- Feng, Chinese empress and regent of Northern Wei (b. 442)
- Peter III Mongus, patriarch of Alexandria
- Theodora of Alexandria, Desert Mother

491

- April 9 – Zeno, Byzantine Emperor
- Peter the Iberian, Georgian theologian and saint

492

- March 1 – Pope Felix III
- Xiao Ni, prince of Southern Qi (b. 444)

493

- March 15 – Odoacer, first "barbarian" king of Italy (b. 433)
- March 17 (approximate date) – Saint Patrick, Romano-British Christian missionary, patron saint of Ireland
- Chilperic II, king of Burgundy
- Daniel the Stylite, Christian saint
- Onoulphus, general and brother of Odoacer
- Emperor Wu of Southern Qi (b. 440)
- Xiao Zhangmao, crown prince of Southern Qi (b. 458)

494

- Xiao Zhaowen, emperor of Southern Qi (b. 480)
- Xiao Zhaoye, emperor of Southern Qi (known as the Prince of Yulin) (b. 473)

495

- Fráech mac Finchada, king of Leinster

496

- November 21 – Pope Gelasius I.
- Athanasius, Coptic Orthodox patriarch of Alexandria
- Epiphanius, bishop of Pavia (b. 438).
- Gennadius of Massilia, priest and historian.
- Gibuld, king of the Alamanni
- Gunthamund, king of the Vandals and Alans

497

- Hashim ibn 'Abd Manaf, great-grandfather of Mohammed
- Longinus of Cardala, Isaurian official, rebel leader
- Crown Prince Yuan Xun of Northern Wei (b. 483)

498

- November 19 – Pope Anastasius II
- Ninken, emperor of Japan
- Qi Mingdi, emperor of Southern Qi (b. 452)

499

- April 26 – Emperor Xiaowen of Northern Wei, emperor of Northern Wei (b. 467)
- Feng Run, Chinese empress of Northern Wei
