= 492 =

Calendar year

492 in various calendars
Gregorian calendar	492; CDXCII
Ab urbe condita	1245
Assyrian calendar	5242
Balinese saka calendar	413–414
Bengali calendar	−102 – −101
Berber calendar	1442
Buddhist calendar	1036
Burmese calendar	−146
Byzantine calendar	6000–6001
Chinese calendar	辛未年 (Metal Goat); 3189 or 2982 — to — 壬申年 (Water Monkey); 3190 or 2983
Coptic calendar	208–209
Discordian calendar	1658
Ethiopian calendar	484–485
Hebrew calendar	4252–4253
- Hindu calendars
Vikram Samvat	548–549
Shaka Samvat	413–414
Kali Yuga	3592–3593
Holocene calendar	10492
Iranian calendar	130 BP – 129 BP
Islamic calendar	134 BH – 133 BH
Javanese calendar	378–379
Julian calendar	492; CDXCII
Korean calendar	2825
Minguo calendar	1420 before ROC 民前1420年
Nanakshahi calendar	−976
Seleucid era	803/804 AG
Thai solar calendar	1034–1035
Tibetan calendar	ལྕགས་མོ་ལུག་ལོ་ (female Iron-Sheep); 618 or 237 or −535 — to — ཆུ་ཕོ་སྤྲེ་ལོ་ (male Water-Monkey); 619 or 238 or −534

Year 492 (CDXCII) was a leap year starting on Wednesday of the Julian calendar. At the time, it was known as the Year of the Consulship of Anastasius and Rufus (or, less frequently, year 1245 Ab urbe condita). The denomination 492 for this year has been used since the early medieval period, when the Anno Domini calendar era became the prevalent method in Europe for naming years.

== Events ==
=== By place ===
==== Byzantine Empire ====
- Isaurian War: The Isaurians begin a revolt against Emperor Anastasius I in southern Central Anatolia.
- Battle of Cotyaeum: The Isaurian rebels are defeated by the Eastern Roman army, under John the Scythian and John the Hunchback (subordinate commanders include the future Justin I). They retreat to their mountain fortresses, and continue guerrilla warfare against the Roman forces until 497.

==== Europe ====
- King Theoderic the Great conquers Rimini, and brings his Ostrogoth fleet to blockade the harbours 6 miles from the capital of Ravenna. Important provisions, food and supplies are cut off, and the inhabitants are starved to death.

=== By topic ===
==== Religion ====
- March 1 – Pope Felix III dies after a 9-year reign in which he has excommunicated Patriarch Acacius of Constantinople, thus dividing the Western Church and Eastern Church (Acacian schism). He is succeeded by Gelasius I as the 49th pope.

== Deaths ==
- March 1 – Pope Felix III
- Xiao Ni, prince of Southern Qi (b. 444)
