= Claudiopolis =

Claudiopolis (Ancient Greek: Κλαυδιόπολις, romanized: Klaudiopolis, lit. 'city of Claudius') is the name of a number of ancient cities named after Roman emperor Claudius or another person bearing that name (in the case of Cluj-Napoca), notably:

in Turkey

- Claudiopolis (Bithynia) or Bithynium
- Claudiopolis (Bolu)
- Claudiopolis (Cilicia)
- Claudiopolis (Cappadocia)
- Claudiopolis (Cataonia)
- Claudiopolis (Galatia)

Elsewhere

- Abila Lysaniou, an ancient city in Syria also called Claudiopolis
- Cluj-Napoca, a city in Romania
- The ancient town of Cyrene, Libya, renamed after 262 AD, in honor of the 3rd-century Roman emperor Claudius II
