= 498 =

Calendar year

498 in various calendars
- Gregorian calendar: 498; CDXCVIII
- Ab urbe condita: 1251
- Assyrian calendar: 5248
- Balinese saka calendar: 419–420
- Bengali calendar: −96 – −95
- Berber calendar: 1448
- Buddhist calendar: 1042
- Burmese calendar: −140
- Byzantine calendar: 6006–6007
- Chinese calendar: 丁丑年 (Fire Ox); 3195 or 2988 — to — 戊寅年 (Earth Tiger); 3196 or 2989
- Coptic calendar: 214–215
- Discordian calendar: 1664
- Ethiopian calendar: 490–491
- Hebrew calendar: 4258–4259
- Hindu calendars
- Vikram Samvat: 554–555
- Shaka Samvat: 419–420
- Kali Yuga: 3598–3599
- Holocene calendar: 10498
- Iranian calendar: 124 BP – 123 BP
- Islamic calendar: 128 BH – 127 BH
- Javanese calendar: 384–385
- Julian calendar: 498; CDXCVIII
- Korean calendar: 2831
- Minguo calendar: 1414 before ROC 民前1414年
- Nanakshahi calendar: −970
- Seleucid era: 809/810 AG
- Thai solar calendar: 1040–1041
- Tibetan calendar: མེ་མོ་གླང་ལོ་ (female Fire-Ox); 624 or 243 or −529 — to — ས་ཕོ་སྟག་ལོ་ (male Earth-Tiger); 625 or 244 or −528

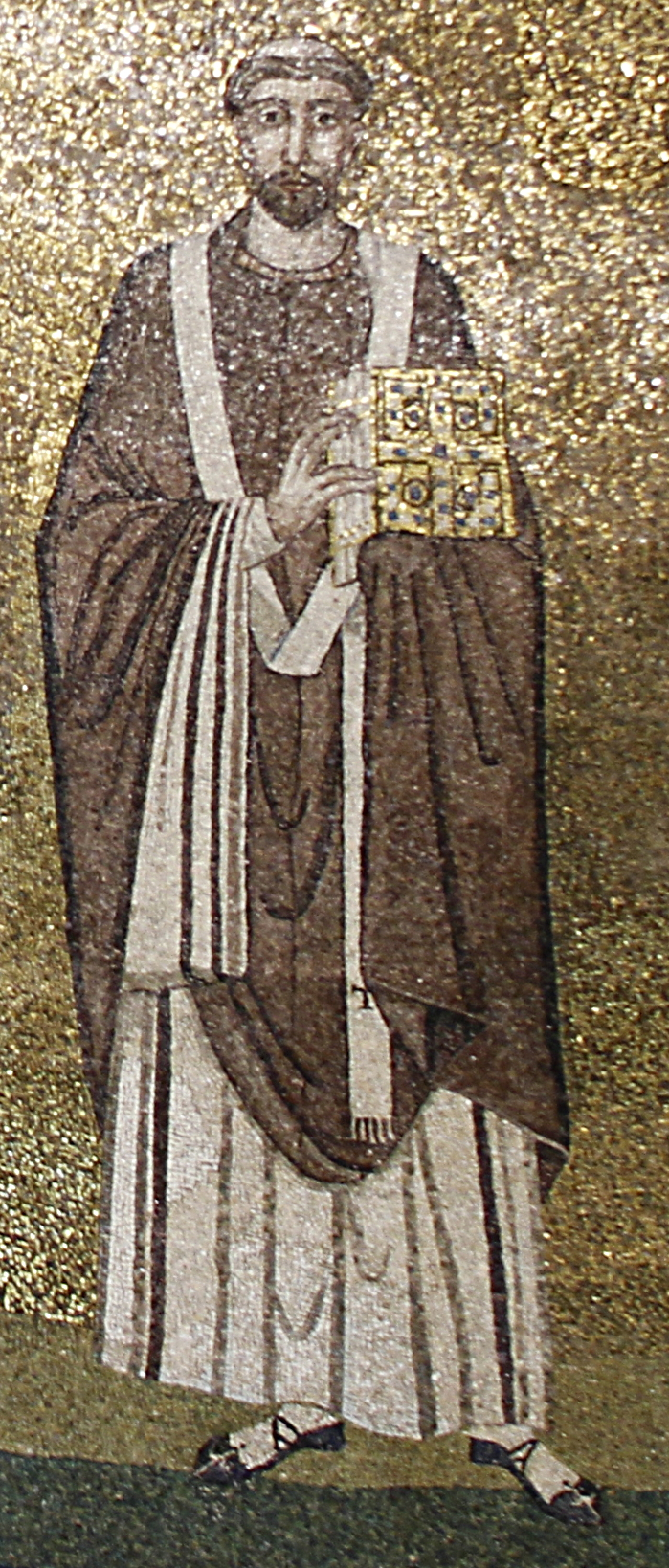
Pope Symmachus (498–514)

Year 498 (CDXCVIII) was a common year starting on Thursday of the Julian calendar. At the time, it was known as the Year of the Consulship of Paulinus and Scytha (or, less frequently, year 1251 Ab urbe condita). The denomination 498 for this year has been used since the early medieval period, when the Anno Domini calendar era became the prevalent method in Europe for naming years.

== Events ==
=== By place ===
==== Byzantine Empire ====
- Emperor Anastasius I abolishes the chrysargyron tax throughout the Eastern Roman Empire, before reforming the monetary system, using Greek numerals instead of Roman.

==== Persia ====
- Kavadh I returns from exile with support of 30,000 Hephthalites (White Huns), and again assumes the Sassanid throne. He punishes his opponents and probably his brother Djamasp, who usurped the throne from him.

==== Japan ====
- Prince Buretsu, age 9, succeeds his father Ninken and becomes the 25th emperor.

=== By topic ===
==== Religion ====
- November 19 – Pope Anastasius II dies after a 2-year reign in which he has tried to conciliate followers of Acacius, late patriarch of Constantinople, who was excommunicated by Felix III.
- November 22 – Anastasius is succeeded by Symmachus as the 51st pope, in the official papal selection in the Lateran Palace (Rome). Meanwhile, Antipope Laurentius is elected "pope" in the Basilica di Santa Maria Maggiore, causing a schism.
- Flavian II succeeds Palladius as patriarch of Antioch.

== Births ==
- Jie Min Di, emperor of Northern Wei (d. 532)
- Kevin of Glendalough, Irish abbot and saint (d. 618)

== Deaths ==
- November 19 – Pope Anastasius II
- Ninken, emperor of Japan
- Qi Mingdi, emperor of Southern Qi (b. 452)
