= Zolban =

Zolban or Zolbon (fl. 491) was a Hun general fighting for the Byzantine Empire. He fought alongside fellow Hun commander Sigizan against the Isaurians in 493 AD.

== History ==
He was a commander of the Hun auxiliaries in the Byzantine Empire. Zolban commanded the Huns in the army of Eastern Roman emperor Anastasius I Dicorus against the Isaurian rebels in the Isaurian War (492-497). In this conflict, the East army probably sided with the Isaurians. The (Roman) Imperial army consisted chiefly of troops and leaders posted in Thrace, and it included about 6,500 cavalrymen with the Praesental Army, 3,500 cavalrymen with the Thracian Army, 2,000 Scholarii, 2,000 horsemen under Justin, and 10,000 Huns under Zolban and Sigizan, for an estimated combined cavalry force of 34,000, adding to 70,000 infantrymen. The armies were evenly matched in terms of numbers, but the Imperial Army included more cavalrymen. At the major Battle of Cotyaeum, Lilingis, an Isaurian governor and excellent horseman, was killed, and the Imperial Army destroyed most of their adversaries. However, as they stopped to pillage, some of the Isaurians managed to flee to the mountains and the war, which might've ended with this battle, dragged on for several years of guerilla warfare and sieges.

The war eventually resulted in a Roman victory.

== Etymology ==
His name is of Turkic origin, cf. Zolbon (colban, colbon, solbon), the "shepherd's star", i.e. Venus, and Colpan, a Mamluk name.
