= 493 =

Calendar year

493 in various calendars
Gregorian calendar	493; CDXCIII
Ab urbe condita	1246
Assyrian calendar	5243
Balinese saka calendar	414–415
Bengali calendar	−101 – −100
Berber calendar	1443
Buddhist calendar	1037
Burmese calendar	−145
Byzantine calendar	6001–6002
Chinese calendar	壬申年 (Water Monkey); 3190 or 2983 — to — 癸酉年 (Water Rooster); 3191 or 2984
Coptic calendar	209–210
Discordian calendar	1659
Ethiopian calendar	485–486
Hebrew calendar	4253–4254
- Hindu calendars
Vikram Samvat	549–550
Shaka Samvat	414–415
Kali Yuga	3593–3594
Holocene calendar	10493
Iranian calendar	129 BP – 128 BP
Islamic calendar	133 BH – 132 BH
Javanese calendar	379–380
Julian calendar	493; CDXCIII
Korean calendar	2826
Minguo calendar	1419 before ROC 民前1419年
Nanakshahi calendar	−975
Seleucid era	804/805 AG
Thai solar calendar	1035–1036
Tibetan calendar	ཆུ་ཕོ་སྤྲེ་ལོ་ (male Water-Monkey); 619 or 238 or −534 — to — ཆུ་མོ་བྱ་ལོ་ (female Water-Bird); 620 or 239 or −533

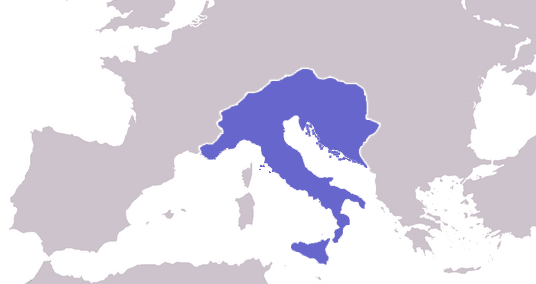
The Ostrogothic Kingdom (493–553)

Year 493 (CDXCIII) was a common year starting on Friday of the Julian calendar. At the time, it was known as the Year of the Consulship of Albinus and Eusebius (or, less frequently, year 1246 ab urbe condita). The denomination 493 for this year has been used since the early medieval period, when the Anno Domini calendar era became the prevalent method in Europe for naming years.

== Events ==
=== By place ===
==== Byzantine Empire ====
- Isaurian War: Claudiopolis, ancient city of Cappadocia, is besieged and captured by the Romans. The Isaurians blockade the mountain passes, but John the Hunchback (John Gibbo) wins an overwhelming victory against the rebels.

==== Ireland ====
- March – Battle for the Body of St. Patrick: The Uí Néill Dynasty fights over the body of Saint Patrick with the Airgialla Kingdom (according to the Annals of the Four Masters).

==== Europe ====
- February 25 – Odoacer surrenders Ravenna after a 3-year siege, and agrees to a mediated peace with Theodoric the Great, who steadily consolidates his rule and provides security for the local population. His achievement is to manage the transformation of Italy from being the center of a fractured Roman Empire to a successful and independent Ostrogothic Kingdom.
- Onoulphus, brother of Odoacer, is killed during the siege of Ravenna by archers while seeking refuge in a church.
- March 15 – Odoacer is invited to a banquet organised in order to celebrate the peace treaty. During the festivities, Odoacer is killed by Theodoric the Great. His body is skillfully sliced in half in full view of his guests. A massacre of Odoacer's soldiers and supporters follows.
- Theodoric the Great allies with the Franks and marries Audofleda, sister of Clovis I. He also marries his own female relatives to princes or kings of the Burgundians, Vandals and Visigoths, establishing a political alliance with the Germanic kingdoms in the West.
- Clovis I marries the Burgundian princess Clotilde, age 18; she is brought up in the Catholic faith and is the daughter of King Chilperic II. Her father is murdered in the same year by his brother Gundobad.

==== China ====
- Emperor Xiao Wen Di starts adopting a sinicization policy as well as various reforms. He marries Feng Qing, who becomes empress of the Northern Wei Dynasty.

=== By topic ===
==== Religion ====
- Mor Hananyo Monastery is established by Mor Shlemon, converting a former Roman fortress (ex temple) in the Tur Abdin region on the Turkish/Syrian border.

== Births ==
- Cerbonius, bishop of Populonia (approximate date)
- Erzhu Rong, general of Northern Wei (d. 530)

== Deaths ==
- March 15 – Odoacer, first "barbarian" king of Italy (b. 433)
- March 17 (approximate date) – Saint Patrick, Romano-British Christian missionary, patron saint of Ireland
- Chilperic II, king of Burgundy
- Daniel the Stylite, Christian saint
- Onoulphus, general and brother of Odoacer
- Emperor Wu of Southern Qi (b. 440)
- Xiao Zhangmao, crown prince of Southern Qi (b. 458)
