= 497 =

Calendar year

497 in various calendars
- Gregorian calendar: 497; CDXCVII
- Ab urbe condita: 1250
- Assyrian calendar: 5247
- Balinese saka calendar: 418–419
- Bengali calendar: −97 – −96
- Berber calendar: 1447
- Buddhist calendar: 1041
- Burmese calendar: −141
- Byzantine calendar: 6005–6006
- Chinese calendar: 丙子年 (Fire Rat); 3194 or 2987 — to — 丁丑年 (Fire Ox); 3195 or 2988
- Coptic calendar: 213–214
- Discordian calendar: 1663
- Ethiopian calendar: 489–490
- Hebrew calendar: 4257–4258
- Hindu calendars
- Vikram Samvat: 553–554
- Shaka Samvat: 418–419
- Kali Yuga: 3597–3598
- Holocene calendar: 10497
- Iranian calendar: 125 BP – 124 BP
- Islamic calendar: 129 BH – 128 BH
- Javanese calendar: 383–384
- Julian calendar: 497; CDXCVII
- Korean calendar: 2830
- Minguo calendar: 1415 before ROC 民前1415年
- Nanakshahi calendar: −971
- Seleucid era: 808/809 AG
- Thai solar calendar: 1039–1040
- Tibetan calendar: མེ་ཕོ་བྱི་བ་ལོ་ (male Fire-Rat); 623 or 242 or −530 — to — མེ་མོ་གླང་ལོ་ (female Fire-Ox); 624 or 243 or −529

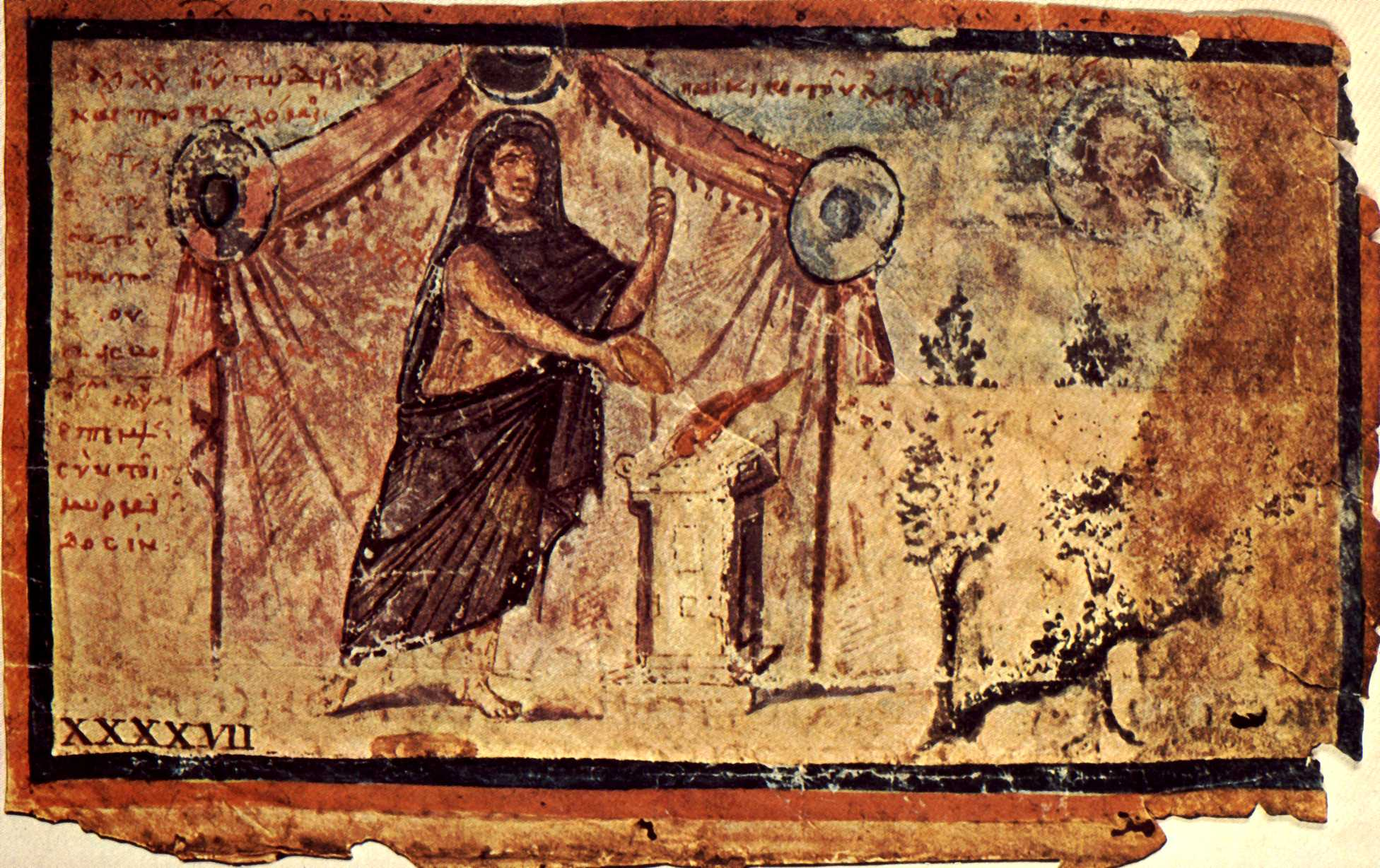
Achilles sacrificing to Zeus (Ambrosian Iliad)

Year 497 (CDXCVII) was a common year starting on Wednesday of the Julian calendar. At the time, it was known as the Year of the Consulship of Anastasius without colleague (or, less frequently, year 1250 Ab urbe condita). The denomination 497 for this year has been used since the early medieval period, when the Anno Domini calendar era became the prevalent method in Europe for naming years.

== Events ==
=== By place ===
==== Byzantine Empire ====
- Emperor Anastasius I gives formal recognition to the Ostrogoth king Theodoric the Great, as his representative (viceroy) in Italy. He sends the imperial standard to Ravenna. Theodoric respects the agreement and allows Roman citizens within the Ostrogothic Kingdom to be subject to Roman law.
- Isaurian War: Anastasius I regains control of the Isauria region (Asia Minor) and has the rebel leaders executed. Anastasius I pacifies the mountain strongholds of the Isaurians, ending the revolt that they began upon his ascension to the throne 6 years ago.

==== China ====
- The Shaolin Temple (Henan) is founded (according to the Jiaqing Chongxiu Yitongzhi). (For alternate founding date, see 477 or 495).
- Emperor Xiaowen of Northern Wei fought several battles

=== By topic ===
==== Arts and sciences ====
- Aryabhata, Indian astronomer and mathematician, calculates pi (π) as ≈ 62832/20000 = 3.1416, correct to four rounded-off decimal places.

==== Literature ====
- The Ambrosian Iliad, an Illuminated manuscript on vellum, of the Iliad of Homer, is produced in Constantinople (approximate date).

== Births ==
- Abdul Mutallib, grandfather of Islamic prophet Mohammed (d. 578)
- Cadoc, Welsh abbot, saint (approximate date)
- Chlothar I, king of the Franks (d. 561)
- Wei Jie, Chinese scholar (d. 569)

== Deaths ==
- Hashim ibn 'Abd Manaf, great-grandfather of Mohammed
- Longinus of Cardala, Isaurian official, rebel leader
- Crown Prince Yuan Xun of Northern Wei (b. 483)
