= 491 =

Calendar year

491 in various calendars
- Gregorian calendar: 491; CDXCI
- Ab urbe condita: 1244
- Assyrian calendar: 5241
- Balinese saka calendar: 412–413
- Bengali calendar: −103 – −102
- Berber calendar: 1441
- Buddhist calendar: 1035
- Burmese calendar: −147
- Byzantine calendar: 5999–6000
- Chinese calendar: 庚午年 (Metal Horse); 3188 or 2981 — to — 辛未年 (Metal Goat); 3189 or 2982
- Coptic calendar: 207–208
- Discordian calendar: 1657
- Ethiopian calendar: 483–484
- Hebrew calendar: 4251–4252
- Hindu calendars
- Vikram Samvat: 547–548
- Shaka Samvat: 412–413
- Kali Yuga: 3591–3592
- Holocene calendar: 10491
- Iranian calendar: 131 BP – 130 BP
- Islamic calendar: 135 BH – 134 BH
- Javanese calendar: 377–378
- Julian calendar: 491; CDXCI
- Korean calendar: 2824
- Minguo calendar: 1421 before ROC 民前1421年
- Nanakshahi calendar: −977
- Seleucid era: 802/803 AG
- Thai solar calendar: 1033–1034
- Tibetan calendar: ལྕགས་ཕོ་རྟ་ལོ་ (male Iron-Horse); 617 or 236 or −536 — to — ལྕགས་མོ་ལུག་ལོ་ (female Iron-Sheep); 618 or 237 or −535

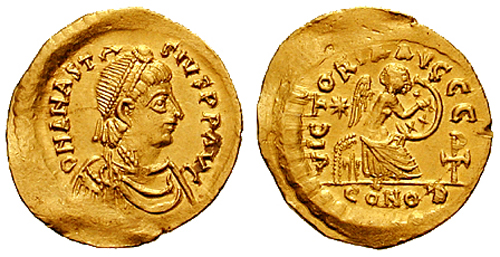
Emperor Anastasius I (491–518)

Year 491 (CDXCI) was a common year starting on Tuesday of the Julian calendar. At the time, it was known as the Year of the Consulship of Olybrius without colleague (or, less frequently, year 1244 Ab urbe condita). The denomination 491 for this year has been used since the early medieval period, when the Anno Domini calendar era became the prevalent method in Europe for naming years.

== Events ==
=== By place ===
==== Byzantine Empire ====
- April 9 – Emperor Zeno, age 66, dies of dysentery (or of epilepsy) after a 17-year reign. He has no sons to succeed him and Anastasius, palace official (silentiarius) and favoured friend of empress Ariadne, is elevated to the throne.
- May 20 – Anastasius I marries Ariadne shortly after his accession. His reign is disturbed by religious distractions and a civil war started by Longinus, brother of late emperor Zeno.
- Anti-Isaurian riots break out in the Hippodrome at Constantinople. Longinus and several other Isaurians, including general Longinus of Cardala, are exiled to Thebaid (Egypt).

==== Britannia ====
- Aelle of Sussex besieges and conquers the fortified town Anderitum in southern Britain. He massacres the population, apparently sub-Roman Brythons (according to the Anglo-Saxon Chronicle).

==== Europe ====
- July 9 – Odoacer makes a night assault with his Heruli guardsmen, engaging Theodoric the Great in Ad Pinetam. Both sides suffer heavy losses, but in the end Theodoric repulses the attack, forcing Odoacer back into Ravenna.

==== Asia ====
- Munjamyeong becomes ruler of the Korean kingdom of Goguryeo.

=== By topic ===
==== Religion ====
- Lupicinus becomes bishop of Lyon. He is the founder of the abbeys of Saint Claude (Jura Mountains).

== Births ==
- Approximate date – John Malalas, Byzantine chronicler (d. c. 578)

== Deaths ==
- April 9 – Zeno, Byzantine Emperor
- Peter the Iberian, Georgian theologian and saint
