= 544 =

Calendar year

544 in various calendars
- Gregorian calendar: 544; DXLIV
- Ab urbe condita: 1297
- Assyrian calendar: 5294
- Balinese saka calendar: 465–466
- Bengali calendar: −50 – −49
- Berber calendar: 1494
- Buddhist calendar: 1088
- Burmese calendar: −94
- Byzantine calendar: 6052–6053
- Chinese calendar: 癸亥年 (Water Pig); 3241 or 3034 — to — 甲子年 (Wood Rat); 3242 or 3035
- Coptic calendar: 260–261
- Discordian calendar: 1710
- Ethiopian calendar: 536–537
- Hebrew calendar: 4304–4305
- Hindu calendars
- Vikram Samvat: 600–601
- Shaka Samvat: 465–466
- Kali Yuga: 3644–3645
- Holocene calendar: 10544
- Iranian calendar: 78 BP – 77 BP
- Islamic calendar: 80 BH – 79 BH
- Javanese calendar: 431–432
- Julian calendar: 544; DXLIV
- Korean calendar: 2877
- Minguo calendar: 1368 before ROC 民前1368年
- Nanakshahi calendar: −924
- Seleucid era: 855/856 AG
- Thai solar calendar: 1086–1087
- Tibetan calendar: ཆུ་མོ་ཕག་ལོ་ (female Water-Boar); 670 or 289 or −483 — to — ཤིང་ཕོ་བྱི་བ་ལོ་ (male Wood-Rat); 671 or 290 or −482

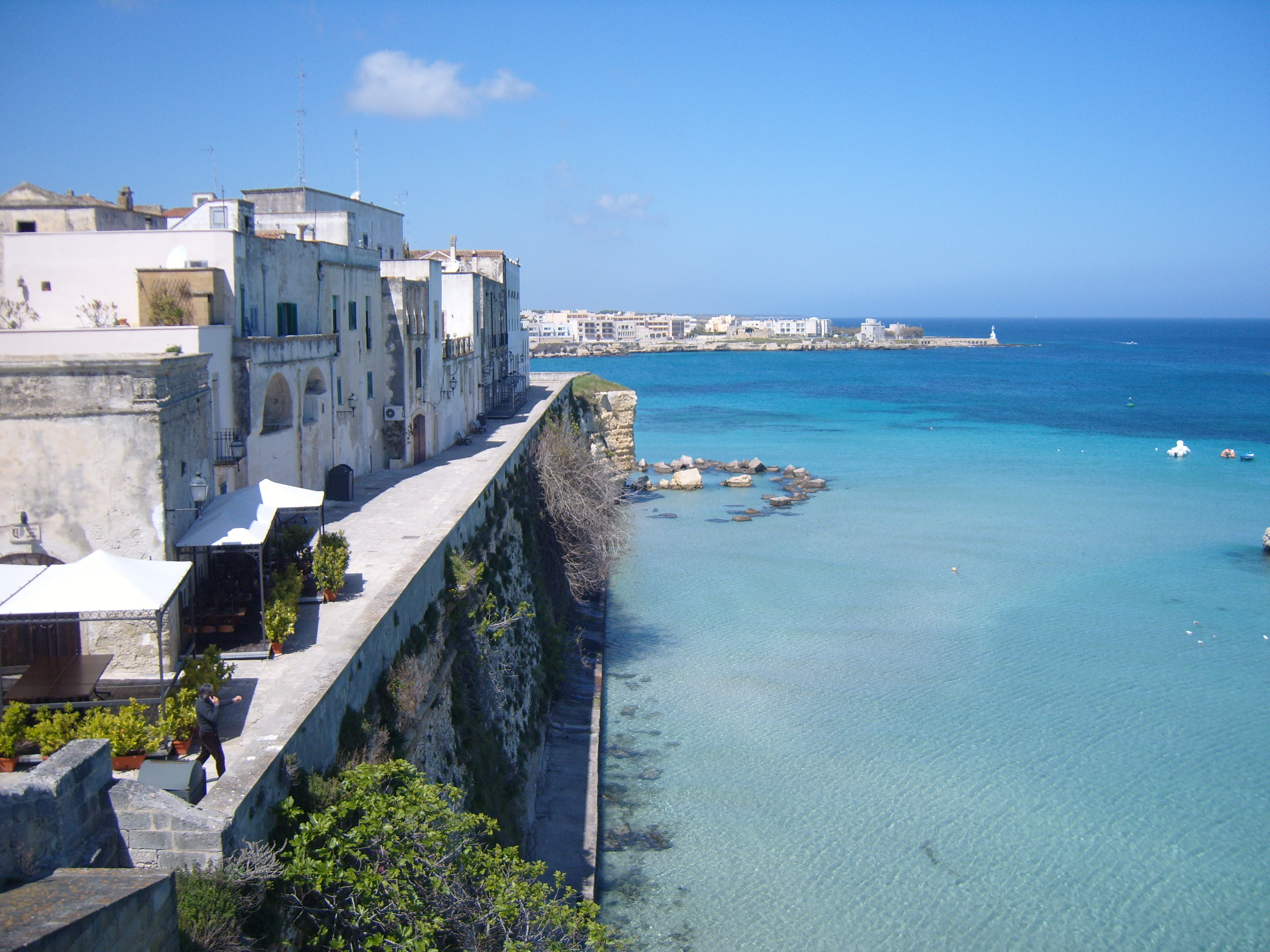
Otranto seen from the castle (2008)

Year 544 (DXLIV) was a leap year starting on Friday of the Julian calendar. The denomination 544 for this year has been used since the early medieval period, when the Anno Domini calendar era became the prevalent method in Europe for naming years.

== Events ==
=== By place ===
==== The Mediterranean World, Europe, and the Middle East ====
- Gothic War: Emperor Justinian I sends Belisarius back to the Ostrogothic Kingdom (Italy) with an inadequate Byzantine expeditionary force (4,000 men and 200 ships).
- Belisarius defeats the Gothic army under King Totila, who unsuccessfully besieges the city of Otranto (southern Italy). After their retreat, the Byzantines march towards the city of Rome.
- Justinian I issues a new edict condemning the Three Chapters. In Western Europe, Pope Vigilius refuses to acknowledge the imperial edict and is ordered to summon to Constantinople.
- King Khosrau I unsuccessfully attacks the Byzantine fortress city of Dara. The siege of Edessa is repulsed, and the Persians are forced into a stalemate.
- Battle of Cillium: A medium-sized Byzantine army under Solomon is defeated by the Moors on the border of Numidia. Solomon and his bodyguard are forced to retreat and are later killed.

==== Asia ====
- February – Lý Bí is declared emperor and establishes the empire Van Xuân (modern Vietnam). His armies repel attacks from the kingdom of Champa.
- October – The Liang dynasty retaliates against Van Xuân, and sends an imperial army (120,000 men) under Chen Baxian to re-occupy the region.

=== By topic ===
==== Religion ====
- Jacob Baradaeus consecrates Sergius of Tella as patriarch of Antioch, opening a permanent schism between the Syriac Orthodox Church and the Eastern Orthodox Church.

== Births ==
- Dugu Qieluo, empress of the Sui dynasty (d. 602)
- Jing Di, emperor of the Liang dynasty (d. 558)
- Yuwen Xian, prince of Northern Zhou (d. 578)

== Deaths ==
- October 18 – Wenna, Cornish saint (approximate date)
- Dionysius Exiguus, inventor of the Anno Domini era (approximate date)
- Solomon, Byzantine general and prefect of Africa

== Bibliography ==
- Martindale, John R., ed. (1992). The Prosopography of the Later Roman Empire: Volume III, AD 527–641. Cambridge: Cambridge University Press. ISBN 0-521-20160-8.
- Bury, John Bagnell (1958) [1923]. History of the Later Roman Empire: From the Death of Theodosius I to the Death of Justinian, Volume 2. Mineola, New York: Dover Publications. OCLC 41478187.
- Kazhdan, Alexander, ed. (1991). The Oxford Dictionary of Byzantium. Oxford and New York: Oxford University Press. ISBN 0-19-504652-8.
