= 483rd =

483rd or 483d may refer to:

- 483d Bombardment Squadron or 303d Air Refueling Squadron, inactive United States Air Force unit
- 483d Tactical Airlift Wing, tactical airlift and composite wing assigned to Pacific Air Forces during the Vietnam War

== See also ==
- 483 (number)
- 483, the year 483 (CDLXXXIII) of the Julian calendar
- 483 BC
