= 492nd =

492nd may refer to:

- 492d Bombardment Group, inactive United States Army Air Force unit
- 492d Bombardment Squadron, inactive United States Air Force unit
- 492d Fighter Squadron (492 FS), part of the 48th Fighter Wing at RAF Lakenheath, England

== See also ==
- 492 (number)
- 492, the year 492 (CDXCII) of the Julian calendar
- 492 BC
