= Claudiopolis (Cilicia) =

Roman historical city in Turkey

Coordinates: 36°39′06″N 33°26′30″E

Probable location of Claudiopolis in modern Turkey

Claudiopolis (Ancient Greek: Κλαυδιόπολις) also called Ninica and Ninica Claudiopolis, was an ancient city of Cilicia. Ammianus mentions Seleucia and Claudiopolis as cities of Cilicia or of the country drained by the Calycadnus, and Claudiopolis was a colony of Claudius Caesar.

== History ==
It is described by Theophanes of Byzantium as situated in a plain between the two Taurus Mountains, a description that exactly corresponds to the position of the basin of the Calycadnus. Claudiopolis may therefore be represented by Mut, which is higher up the valley than Seleucia and near the junction of the northern and western branches of the Calycadnus. It is also the place to which the pass over the northern Taurus leads from Laranda. Pliny mentions a Claudiopolis of Cappadocia, and Ptolemy has a Claudiopolis in Cataonia.

Both these passages and those of Ammianus and Theophanes are cited to prove that there is a Claudiopolis in Cataonia, but it is manifest that the passage in Ammianus at least can apply only to a town in the valley of the Calycadnus in Cilicia Trachea. The two Tauri of Theophanes might mean the Taurus and Antitaurus, but Hierocles places Claudiopolis in Isauria, a description that cannot apply to the places so named of Pliny and Ptolemy. The city apparently received the Roman colony name Colonia Iulia Felix Augusta Ninica and minted coins in antiquity.

Later assigned to the province of Isauria, the town became a bishopric. It is no longer the seat of a residential bishop but remains a titular see of the Roman Catholic Church under the name of Claudiopolis in Isauria.

== Location ==
Its site is located near modern Mut, Asiatic Turkey.
