= Longinus of Selinus =

Longinus of Selinus (Greek: Λογγῖνος; Latin: Longinus Selinuntius; born early 5th century, died 498) was one of the Isaurian leaders in the Isaurian War of 492–497.

== Biography ==
Little is known about the life of Longinus except that he was born in the Isaurian city of Selinus. He was a leader of the Isaurian revolt that erupted with the appointment of the senior officer Anastasius I as the succeeding emperor of Zeno, Byzantine Emperor from 474 to 475 and 476 to 491. After two major defeats (in 492 and 493), the Isaurian rebels closed themselves in their fortresses in the Isaurian mountains from 494 to 497, where they were kept supplied by Longinus through the port of Antioch.

In 497, the war ended with the death of its leaders and a year later, Longinus was captured at Antiochia Lamotis by Roman general John the Hunchback, sent to Constantinople to be paraded at Anastasius' victory celebration, then tortured and beheaded at Nicaea in Bithynia.

== Bibliography ==
- Martindale, John R.; Jones, A. H. M.; Morris, John, eds. (1971). "Longinus of Selinus 4". The Prosopography of the Later Roman Empire: Volume I, AD 260–395. Cambridge: Cambridge University Press. p. 688. ISBN 0-521-07233-6.
