= 495 =

Calendar year

495 in various calendars
- Gregorian calendar: 495; CDXCV
- Ab urbe condita: 1248
- Assyrian calendar: 5245
- Balinese saka calendar: 416–417
- Bengali calendar: −99 – −98
- Berber calendar: 1445
- Buddhist calendar: 1039
- Burmese calendar: −143
- Byzantine calendar: 6003–6004
- Chinese calendar: 甲戌年 (Wood Dog); 3192 or 2985 — to — 乙亥年 (Wood Pig); 3193 or 2986
- Coptic calendar: 211–212
- Discordian calendar: 1661
- Ethiopian calendar: 487–488
- Hebrew calendar: 4255–4256
- Hindu calendars
- Vikram Samvat: 551–552
- Shaka Samvat: 416–417
- Kali Yuga: 3595–3596
- Holocene calendar: 10495
- Iranian calendar: 127 BP – 126 BP
- Islamic calendar: 131 BH – 130 BH
- Javanese calendar: 381–382
- Julian calendar: 495; CDXCV
- Korean calendar: 2828
- Minguo calendar: 1417 before ROC 民前1417年
- Nanakshahi calendar: −973
- Seleucid era: 806/807 AG
- Thai solar calendar: 1037–1038
- Tibetan calendar: ཤིང་ཕོ་ཁྱི་ལོ་ (male Wood-Dog); 621 or 240 or −532 — to — ཤིང་མོ་ཕག་ལོ་ (female Wood-Boar); 622 or 241 or −531

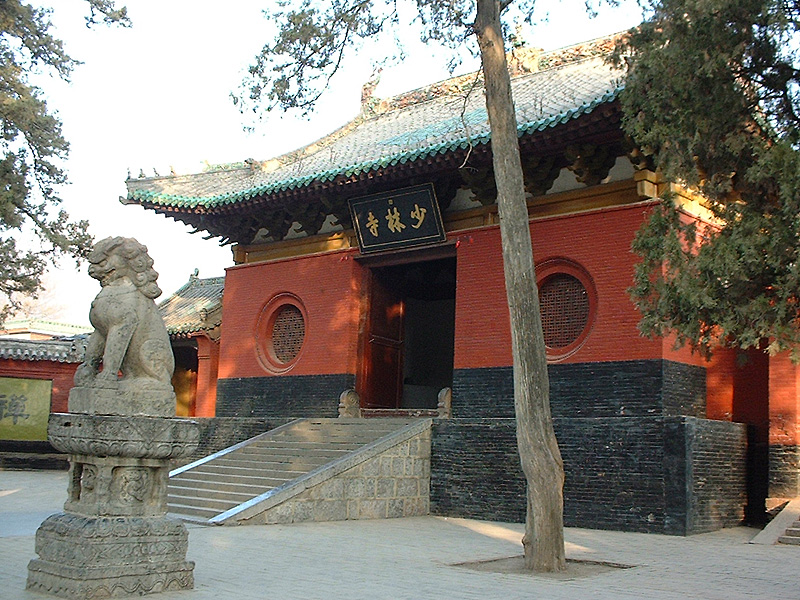
The Shaolin Monastery (Henan)

Year 495 (CDXCV) was a common year starting on Sunday of the Julian calendar. At the time, it was known in Rome as the Year of the Consulship of Viator without colleague (or, less frequently, year 1248 Ab urbe condita). The denomination 495 for this year has been used since the early medieval period, when the Anno Domini calendar era became the prevalent method in Europe for naming years.

== Events ==
=== By place ===
==== Britannia ====
- Cerdic of Wessex and his son, Cynric, land somewhere on the south coast, probably near the Hampshire-Dorset border. Their followers establish the beginnings of the Kingdom of Wessex.

==== China ====
- Emperor Xiao Wen Di of Northern Wei builds the Shaolin Monastery in Henan for the monk Batuo (for alternate founding date see 477 or 497).

=== By topic ===
==== Religion ====
- Pope Gelasius I gains support from Italian bishops, in his assertion that the spiritual power of the papacy is superior to the emperor's temporal authority. Like his predecessors, the pope opposes the Byzantine emperor Anastasius I's efforts to establish Miaphysite doctrine.

== Births ==
- Queen Amalasuintha of the Ostrogoths (approximate date)
- King Chlodomer of the Franks (d. 524)
- Finnian of Movilla, Irish bishop (d. 589)
- Guntheuc, queen of Burgundy and the Franks (d. c. 532)
- Husi Chun, general of Northern Wei (d. 537)
- King Theudebert I of Austrasia (approximate date)

== Deaths ==
- Fráech mac Finchada, king of Leinster
