= Longinus of Cardala =

Eastern Roman official

Longinus of Cardala or Longinus the Bald (Greek: Λογγῖνος ὀ φαλακρὸς, Latin: Longinus Calvus; died in 497) was a high-ranking Eastern Roman official and rebel leader from Isauria.

== Biography ==
Longinus was one of several Isaurians who occupied offices in the imperial civil and military administration, especially under emperor Zeno, who was an Isaurian himself. It is said that he was rich and bald.

Born in Cardala, he was appointed magister officiorum in late 484, after the defeat of the rebels Illus and Leontius, and was in office until 491, when Zeno died. After the death of the Isaurian emperor, there was a struggle for the succession that involved Longinus, Zeno's brother, and Anastasius I, the candidate supported by empress dowager Ariadne; when Anastasius I was proclaimed emperor, Longinus of Cardala was removed from his office.

Many Isaurians were removed from the imperial administration, and this caused the beginning of the Isaurian War (492). Longinus of Cardala returned to Isauria, where he gathered 15,000 soldiers, equipped and fed with the supplies collected there by Zeno. With his men, Longinus attacked the cities in nearby provinces, but was defeated in the battle of Cotyaeum (Kotyaion in Phrygia) by a Roman army led by generals John the Scythian and John the Hunchback.

The Isaurians who survived the battle fled among the mountains of their country and kept fighting in the following years, and Longinus led them. In 497, however, Longinus was captured by John the Scythian and put to death: his head paraded along Constantinople's main street during Anastasius' victory celebration.

== Bibliography ==
- Martindale, John R.; Jones, A. H. M.; Morris, John, eds. (1971). "Longinus of Cardala 3". The Prosopography of the Later Roman Empire: Volume I, AD 260–395. Cambridge: Cambridge University Press. p. 688. ISBN 0-521-07233-6.
