= Sigizan =

Historical Byzantine military officer

Sigizan (fl. 491) was a Hun general in the Byzantine army.

He was a commander of the Hun auxiliaries in the Byzantine Empire, fighting alongside fellow Hun commander Zolban. He fought against the Isaurians in 493 AD.

His name might be of Germanic origin.
