= Paulinus (consul 498) =

Roman Politician

Flavius Paulinus (floruit 498–511) was a Roman politician during the reign of Theodoric the Great, and was appointed consul for the year 498.

== Life ==
Paulinus was appointed consul in 498, sharing the office with the Eastern consul, John the Hunchback. In 510 Paulinus became a patricius.

Between 507 and 511 Quintus Aurelius Memmius Symmachus and Rufius Postumius Festus brought a lawsuit against Paulinus at Rome, but the actual accusation is unknown.

Paulinus was a friend and a supporter of Pope Felix III. King Theodoric of the Ostrogoths gave him all the unused barns of Rome. Some scholars have identified Paulinus with the "ex-consul Paulinus" referred to by Boethius in his De consolatio phililosophiae (I.4.13), whose properties Boethius had defended from the avarice of certain courtiers. If so, then these unnamed courtiers would not have included Aurelius Memmius Symmachus, who was Boethius' father-in-law.

Preceded by Flavius Anastasius Augustus II, II post consulatum Viatoris (West)	Consul of the Roman Empire; 498 with Iohannes Scytha	Succeeded by Flavius Iohannes Gibbus, Post consulatum Paulinii (West)
