= Nicopolis (Armenia) =

Roman colony in Lesser Armenia

- Location within Turkey
- 40°18′N 37°50′E
- Location: Turkey
- Region: Sivas Province

Nicopolis (Greek: Νικόπολις, lit. 'city of victory'; Armenian: Նիկոպոլիս) was a Roman colony in Lesser Armenia founded by Pompey in 63 BC after conquering the Kingdom of Pontus in the Third Mithridatic War. It became part of the Roman province of Armenia Prima. Today, the city of Koyulhisar in northeastern Turkey occupies the site.

== History ==
The city was founded by Pompey after his decisive victory over Mithridates VI of Pontus. It was situated in a well-watered plain lying at the base of a thickly-wooded mountain and was settled by veterans of his army, as well as by the local peasantry. All the Roman highways intersecting that portion of the country and leading to Comana, Polemonium, Neocæsarea, Sebasteia, etc., radiated from Nicopolis which, even in the time of Strabo, boasted quite a large population.

Given to Polemon by Mark Antony in 36 BC, Nicopolis was governed from 54 AD by Aristobulus of Chalcis and definitively annexed to the Roman Empire by Nero, in the year 64 AD. It then became the metropolis of Lesser Armenia and the seat of the provincial diet which elected the Armeniarch. Besides the altar of the Augusti, it raised temples to Zeus Nicephorus and to Victory.

Christianity reached Nicopolis at an early date and, under Licinius, about 319, forty-five of the city's inhabitants were martyred; the Eastern Orthodox Church and Roman Catholic Church venerate them on 10 July, St. Basil calls the priests of Nicopolis the sons of confessors and martyrs, and their church the mother of that of Koloneia. In ca. 472, St. John the Silent, who had sold his worldly goods, erected a church there to the Blessed Virgin. SS Januarius and Pelagia were said to have been martyred in the town.

In 499, Nicopolis was destroyed by the 499 Nicopolis earthquake, with none save the bishop and his two secretaries escaping death. This disaster was irreparable, and although Justinian I rebuilt the walls and erected a monastery in memory of the Forty-Five Martyrs, Nicopolis never regained its former splendour and was superseded by Koloneia.

Under Heraclius it was captured by the forces of Chosroes II and thenceforth was only a mediocre city, a simple see and a suffragan of Sebasteia in Lesser Armenia, remaining such at least until the 11th century, as may be seen from the various Notitiae episcopatuum. In the 9th–11th centuries, it belonged to the theme of Koloneia.

Under the Ottomans, the site of ancient Nicopolis was occupied by the Armenian village of Purkh, near the city of Enderes, in the sanjak of Kara-Hissar and the vilayet of Sivas.

== Bishops ==
Notable among the eight bishops mentioned by Le Quien is Gregory of Nicopolis who, in the 11th century, resigned his bishopric and retired to Pithiviers in France. The Catholic Church venerates him on 14 March. The Catholic Church lists the bishopric as the titular see of Nicopolis in Armenia.
