= Claudiopolis (Galatia) =

Ancient city of Galatia

Claudiopolis (Greek: Κλαυδιόπολις, city of Claudius) was an ancient city of Galatia mentioned by Ptolemy as belonging to the Trocmi. It sat on the Halys river, northwest of Carissa; but its site has not been located. From its name one can adduce that it was named for Roman emperor Claudius.
