= 444 =

444 in various calendars
Gregorian calendar	444; CDXLIV
Ab urbe condita	1197
Assyrian calendar	5194
Balinese saka calendar	365–366
Bengali calendar	−150 – −149
Berber calendar	1394
Buddhist calendar	988
Burmese calendar	−194
Byzantine calendar	5952–5953
Chinese calendar	癸未年 (Water Goat); 3141 or 2934 — to — 甲申年 (Wood Monkey); 3142 or 2935
Coptic calendar	160–161
Discordian calendar	1610
Ethiopian calendar	436–437
Hebrew calendar	4204–4205
- Hindu calendars
Vikram Samvat	500–501
Shaka Samvat	365–366
Kali Yuga	3544–3545
Holocene calendar	10444
Iranian calendar	178 BP – 177 BP
Islamic calendar	184 BH – 182 BH
Javanese calendar	328–329
Julian calendar	444; CDXLIV
Korean calendar	2777
Minguo calendar	1468 before ROC 民前1468年
Nanakshahi calendar	−1024
Seleucid era	755/756 AG
Thai solar calendar	986–987
Tibetan calendar	阴水羊年 (female Water-Goat); 570 or 189 or −583 — to — 阳木猴年 (male Wood-Monkey); 571 or 190 or −582

Year 444 (CDXLIV) was a leap year starting on Saturday of the Julian calendar. At the time, it was known as the Year of the Consulship of Theodosius and Aginatius (or, less frequently, year 1197 Ab urbe condita). The denomination 444 for this year has been used since the early medieval period, when the Anno Domini calendar era became the prevalent method in Europe for naming years.

== Events ==
=== By place ===
==== Europe ====
- Flavius Aetius, Roman general (magister militum), settles the Alans around Valence and Orléans, to contain unrest in Brittany.
- Eudocia, eldest daughter of Emperor Valentinian III, is betrothed to Huneric, son of Vandal King Genseric (hostage in Italy).
- Attila the Hun establishes his residence along the Tisza River (modern Hungary), and plans the coming campaign in the Balkans.
- The Irish city of Armagh is founded by Saint Patrick the Great.

=== By topic ===
==== Religion ====
- Pope Leo I extinguishes the Gallican vicariate.
- Dioscorus I becomes Patriarch of Alexandria.

== Births ==
- Xiao Ni, prince of Southern Qi (d. 492)

== Deaths ==
- Bricius, bishop of Tours
- Cyril of Alexandria, patriarch and theologian
- Juqu Wuhui, prince of Northern Liang
