= Lilingis =

Isaurian governor

Lilingis (died 492) was a governor of Isauria under the reign of the emperor Zeno.

== Biography ==
Lilingis was the half-brother of the influential Isaurian general Illus. In 484, he was given command of an army by Zeno and charged with putting down a revolt against the emperor by Illus. He was ostensibly successful in this, becoming governor of Isauria shortly thereafter.

Upon the death of Zeno in 491, Lilingis and his fellow Isaurians revolted against the new emperor Anastasius, inciting the Isaurian War. He was killed when the Isaurian rebels were routed by the Byzantine Empire at the Battle of Cotyaeum in 492.
