= 499 Nicopolis earthquake =

Coordinates: 40.554°N 36.949°E

The 499 Nicopolis earthquake took place in September 499. It affected the cities of Nicopolis, Neocaesarea (modern Niksar), Arsamosata, and Abarne.

== Tectonic setting ==
Northern Turkey lies across the mainly transform fault boundary between the Anatolian Plate and the Eurasian Plate. The Anatolian Plate is being pushed westwards by the northward moving Arabian Plate. This motion is accommodated by a major dextral (right lateral) strike-slip fault system, the North Anatolian Fault (NAF). In detail the fault is formed of many separate segments. Movement on parts of this fault zone have been responsible for many large and damaging earthquakes. They tend to form overall westward propagating sequences that can last for many decades. The most recent sequence began with the 1939 Erzincan earthquake, continuing with major earthquakes in 1942, 1943, 1944, 1949, 1951, 1957, 1966, 1967, 1992 and two in 1999.

== Earthquake ==
The 499 earthquake is thought to have involved the rupture of the whole of the fault segment that caused the 1939 Erzincan event, 360 km in total. This interpretation is based on the result of paleoseismological investigations across the NAF using trenches to view the displacement of soil horizons that were dated using radiocarbon. Based on the interpreted rupture length, the 499 earthquake is estimated to have had a magnitude in the range M_{w} 7.7–8.4.

== Impact ==
The earthquake took place in the borders between the regions of Mesopotamia, Pontus, and Roman Armenia. It seemingly belongs to the cultural areas of Anatolia (Asia Minor) and Mesopotamia. It is described in detail in the pseudonymous chronicle of Joshua the Stylite (6th century).

The chronicle reports that the earthquake was preceded by a plague of locusts. The earthquake reportedly took place in September. During the earthquake, "a great sound" was reportedly heard from the heaven over the land. The earth trembled, and all nearby villages and towns felt the earthquake and heard the accompanying sound.

The earthquake was accompanied with alarming rumors from various locations. Omens ("signs) were reported from the Euphrates, and the hot spring of Avarne. The "waters which flowed from their fountains" were dried up in the day of the earthquake. The chronicler mentions that it was typical for running waters to be restrained by earthquakes, or their flow to be diverted to other locations.

A letter reported that the city of Nicopolis had collapsed in ruins at midnight, and that its inhabitants were buried in the ruins. The report of the letter was confirmed to the chronicler by travelers who returned from Nicopolis. The defensive walls of Nicopolis had collapsed, along with every building within the city.

According to the chronicler, there were only three survivors. They were the bishop of Nicopolis and two of his companions. The trio were sleeping behind the apse of a church's altar. When the ceiling of their room collapsed, "one end of its beams" was stopped by the altar's wall. The trio were consequently not buried under the collapsed ceiling. The chronicler mentions one of his own acquaintances who left the city shortly before the earthquake, at the insistence of a restless companion. The two men had slept in a cave outside Nicopolis. They returned in the morning and discovered the disaster. According to this supposed eyewitness, the casualties did not include only human residents. The city's cattle, oxen, and camels were trapped beneath the ruins.

The bishop of Nicopolis was rescued by unnamed visitors to the city, who found him underneath the ceiling's beams. The bishop asked them for bread and wine, with the intention to celebrate the Eucharist. However, they could not find bread and wine in the ruins.

In Arsamosata, there was a "strongly built" and "beautifully decorated" church. The locals were scared by thunder and lightning prior to the earthquake, and had fled to this church. They hoped that local relics (the "bones of the saints") would protect them. The church collapsed at midnight, due to the earthquake. Most of the people within were crushed to death.

A shorter description of the earthquake is given by the chronicler Marcellinus Comes (6th century), who reports that the earthquake affected the Roman province of Pontus. The Chronicle of Edessa (6th century), reports the great tremor of the earthquake. According to this chronicle, the hot spring of Abarne remained dried up for three days. It also reports the collapse of Nicopolis, and the survival of the local bishop and two of his attendants.

The historian Theophanes the Confessor (8th century) instead dates this earthquake to Anno Mundi 5995, equivalent to Anno Domini 502 and 503. Theophanes reports a supposed miracle at Neocaesarea which was connected to this earthquake. A soldier who was walking alone near the city, met two unknown (to him) soldiers, and a person who was instructing them to protect the house containing the tomb of Gregory. When the earthquake struck, the church of Gregory Thaumaturgus was one of the few buildings in Neocaesarea which did not collapse. Theophanes attributes this to divine protection.

A Syrian chronicle dating to 819, also records this earthquake. It misdates the earthquake to the year 470. A chronicle attributed to Dionysius I Telmaharoyo (9th century), dates the same earthquake to the year 503, and places it in Mesopotamia. The historian Samuel Anetsi (12th century) dates the earthquake to the year 510. There is also a mention of this earthquake by the chronicler Michael the Syrian (12th century).

Arsamosata was also known as Arsameia. Arsameia and the hot springs of Abarne were both located in the Kingdom of Commagene. The Nicopolis mentioned was probably located in Euphratensis, and may be different than the Nicopolis of Pontus, or the Nicopolis of Palestine (also known as Emmaus Nicopolis).

== Sources ==
- Guidoboni, Emanuela; Traina, Giusto (1995), "A new catalogue of earthquakes in the historical Armenian area from antiquity to the 12th century", Annals of Geophysics, 38, doi:10.4401/ag-4134
