= 477 =

477 in various calendars
- Gregorian calendar: 477; CDLXXVII
- Ab urbe condita: 1230
- Assyrian calendar: 5227
- Balinese saka calendar: 398–399
- Bengali calendar: −117 – −116
- Berber calendar: 1427
- Buddhist calendar: 1021
- Burmese calendar: −161
- Byzantine calendar: 5985–5986
- Chinese calendar: 丙辰年 (Fire Dragon); 3174 or 2967 — to — 丁巳年 (Fire Snake); 3175 or 2968
- Coptic calendar: 193–194
- Discordian calendar: 1643
- Ethiopian calendar: 469–470
- Hebrew calendar: 4237–4238
- Hindu calendars
- Vikram Samvat: 533–534
- Shaka Samvat: 398–399
- Kali Yuga: 3577–3578
- Holocene calendar: 10477
- Iranian calendar: 145 BP – 144 BP
- Islamic calendar: 150 BH – 148 BH
- Javanese calendar: 362–363
- Julian calendar: 477; CDLXXVII
- Korean calendar: 2810
- Minguo calendar: 1435 before ROC 民前1435年
- Nanakshahi calendar: −991
- Seleucid era: 788/789 AG
- Thai solar calendar: 1019–1020
- Tibetan calendar: མེ་ཕོ་འབྲུག་ལོ་ (male Fire-Dragon); 603 or 222 or −550 — to — མེ་མོ་སྦྲུལ་ལོ་ (female Fire-Snake); 604 or 223 or −549

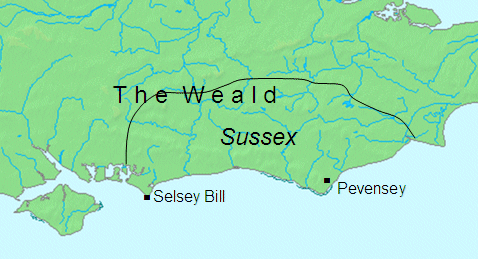
Map of south-eastern England showing places visited by king Aelle (477)

Year 477 (CDLXXVII) was a common year starting on Saturday of the Julian calendar. At the time, it was known as the Year after the Consulship of Basiliscus and Armatus (or, less frequently, year 1230 Ab urbe condita). The denomination 477 for this year has been used since the early medieval period, when the Anno Domini calendar era became the prevalent method in Europe for naming years.

== Events ==
=== By place ===
==== Africa ====
- January 25 – Genseric, ruler of the Vandal Kingdom, dies a natural death at Carthage, and is succeeded by his eldest son Huneric. He maintains control over the islands in the western Mediterranean Sea with his Vandal fleet, and rescinds his father's policy of persecuting the Roman Catholics in Africa.
- The independent Mauro-Roman Kingdom (Kingdom of the Moors and Romans) is formed by Christian Berbers in the Roman province of Mauretania Caesariensis (present-day northern Algeria), bordering the Vandal Kingdom to the east.

==== Europe ====
- Aelle, first king of the South Saxons, lands on the Sussex coast of England with his three sons near Cymenshore, according to the Anglo-Saxon Chronicle. The Britons engage him upon landing, but his superior force besieges them at Pevensey and drives them into the wood called Andredes leage. Over the next nine years, Saxon coastal holdings are gradually expanded.

==== Byzantine Empire ====
- Armatus, Byzantine military commander (magister militum), is killed by order of emperor Zeno, being murdered by his own friend Onoulphus after supporting the rebellion of his uncle Basiliscus in 475.

==== China ====
- Liu Zhun, age 10, becomes Emperor Shun of the Liu Song dynasty after his brother Houfei is assassinated by general Xiao Daocheng. He installs Shun as puppet ruler and sets himself up as regent. Xiao receives near-imperial powers, establishes Buddhism as the state religion and sets up the "Three Leaders" system, under which native hamlet, village and district officers are responsible for taxation and conscription.
- Shaolin Monastery is founded (according to the Continued Biographies of Eminent Monks (645) by Daoxuan; the monastery is built on the north side of Shaoshi Mountain, the western peak of Mount Song, one of the four Sacred Mountains of China, by emperor Xiao Wen Di of the Northern Wei dynasty in 477. Yang Xuanzhi, in the Record of the Buddhist Monasteries of Luoyang (547), and Li Xian, in the Ming Yitongzhi (1461), concur with Daoxuan's location and attribution. For alternate founding date, see 495 or 497).
- Earliest date for the oldest known painted depiction of a horse collar, on a cave mural of Dunhuang, during the Northern Wei dynasty.

==== Asia ====
- Samgeun becomes king of the Korean kingdom of Baekje.

== Deaths ==
- January 25 – Genseric, king of the Vandals and Alans
- Armatus, Byzantine general (magister militum)
- Basina, queen of Thuringia (Germany)
- Houfei Di, emperor of the Liu Song Dynasty (b. 463)
- Munju, king of Baekje (Korea)
- Timothy II, Coptic Orthodox patriarch of Alexandria
