= 440 =

440 in various calendars
- Gregorian calendar: 440; CDXL
- Ab urbe condita: 1193
- Assyrian calendar: 5190
- Balinese saka calendar: 361–362
- Bengali calendar: −154 – −153
- Berber calendar: 1390
- Buddhist calendar: 984
- Burmese calendar: −198
- Byzantine calendar: 5948–5949
- Chinese calendar: 己卯年 (Earth Rabbit); 3137 or 2930 — to — 庚辰年 (Metal Dragon); 3138 or 2931
- Coptic calendar: 156–157
- Discordian calendar: 1606
- Ethiopian calendar: 432–433
- Hebrew calendar: 4200–4201
- Hindu calendars
- Vikram Samvat: 496–497
- Shaka Samvat: 361–362
- Kali Yuga: 3540–3541
- Holocene calendar: 10440
- Iranian calendar: 182 BP – 181 BP
- Islamic calendar: 188 BH – 187 BH
- Javanese calendar: 324–325
- Julian calendar: 440; CDXL
- Korean calendar: 2773
- Minguo calendar: 1472 before ROC 民前1472年
- Nanakshahi calendar: −1028
- Seleucid era: 751/752 AG
- Thai solar calendar: 982–983
- Tibetan calendar: ས་མོ་ཡོས་ལོ་ (female Earth-Hare); 566 or 185 or −587 — to — ལྕགས་ཕོ་འབྲུག་ལོ་ (male Iron-Dragon); 567 or 186 or −586

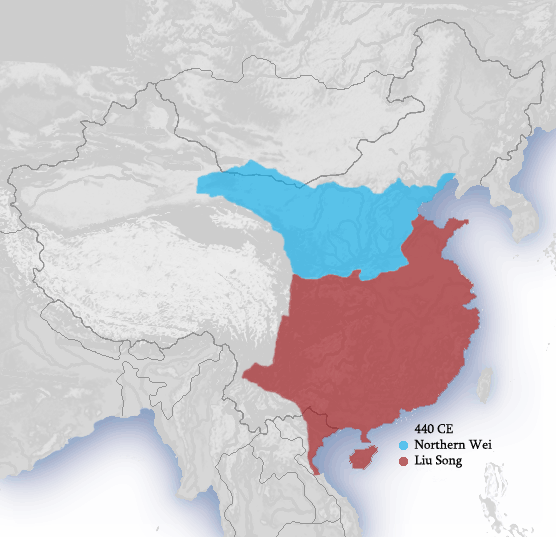
Territories of the Northern Wei (blue) and Liu Song (Red) states (440)

Year 440 (CDXL) was a leap year starting on Monday of the Julian calendar. At the time, it was known as the Year of the Consulship of Valentinianus and Anatolius (or, less frequently, year 1193 Ab urbe condita). The denomination 440 for this year has been used since the early medieval period, when the Anno Domini calendar era became the prevalent method in Europe for naming years.

== Events ==
=== By place ===
==== Europe ====
- Flavius Aetius, Roman general (magister militum), returns as triumphator back to Rome, after several years' fighting the Burgundians and Visigoths in Gaul. He is honoured by a statue erected by the Senate, and by order of Emperor Valentinian III.
- The Huns under Attila reappear in force, along the frontier of the Western Roman Empire. They attack merchants on the north bank of the Danube and cities in Illyricum, including (according to Priscus) Viminacium, city of Moesia.

==== Africa ====
- A Vandal fleet and their allies (Alans, Goths and Moors) set out from Carthage for Sicily, the principal supplier of oil and grain to Italy after the loss of North Africa. They loot all the coastal towns and besiege Palermo. Heavily laden ships return to the court of King Genseric.

==== Asia ====
- Northern and Southern dynasties: Northern China is unified by the Northern Wei dynasty. The South is still under the control of the Song (or Liu Song) dynasty.
- A center of Buddhist studies is established at Nalanda in Bihar on the plains of the Ganges River (India).

==== Persia ====
- The Hephthalites (White Huns) move south from the Altai Mountains region into Transoxiana, Bactria, Khorasan and eastern Persia.

=== By topic ===
==== Art ====
- The Parting of Lot and Abraham, mosaic in the nave arcade, Church of Santa Maria Maggiore (Rome), is made.

==== Ancient Games ====
- Chaturanga, Indian war game and an ancestor of chess through the Persian game of Shatranj (or Chatrang), evolves in the Indus Valley on the Indian subcontinent (approximate date).

==== Religion ====
- August 18 – Pope Sixtus III dies after an 8-year reign in which he has resisted heresy and sponsored major construction programs in Rome. He is succeeded by Leo I as the 45th pope.
- September 29 – Leo I begins to formulate Orthodoxy and condemns Eutychianism, an extreme form of monophysitism which holds that the human nature of Christ is absorbed by His divine nature.
- Winter – Leo I sends a letter to Valentinian III stating, "by the Holy Spirit's inspiration the emperor needs no human instruction and is incapable of doctrinal error".

== Births ==
- Bodhidharma, semi-legendary Buddhist monk (approximate date)
- Euric, Visigothic king and son of Theodoric I (d. 484)
- Gaudentius, son of Flavius Aetius (approximate date)
- Qi Wudi, Chinese emperor of the Southern Qi dynasty (d. 493)
- Tonantius Ferreolus, Gallo-Roman senator and prefect of Gaul
- Vakhtang I, king of Iberia (modern Georgia) (approximate date)
- Wen Cheng Di, emperor of the Northern Wei dynasty (d. 465)

== Deaths ==
- February 17 – Mesrob, Armenian monk and linguist (b. 362)
- August 18 – Pope Sixtus III (b. 390)
- Amalgaid mac Fiachrae, king of Connacht (Ireland)
- Yuan Qigui, empress and wife of Wen of Liu Song (b. 405)

== See also ==
- 4-4-0, a steam locomotive, known by its wheel arrangement & for opening up North America in 1800-1850
