= 578 =

Calendar year

578 in various calendars
| Gregorian calendar | 578; DLXXVIII |
| Ab urbe condita | 1331 |
| Armenian calendar | 27; ԹՎ ԻԷ |
| Assyrian calendar | 5328 |
| Balinese saka calendar | 499–500 |
| Bengali calendar | −16 – −15 |
| Berber calendar | 1528 |
| Buddhist calendar | 1122 |
| Burmese calendar | −60 |
| Byzantine calendar | 6086–6087 |
| Chinese calendar | 丁酉年 (Fire Rooster); 3275 or 3068 — to — 戊戌年 (Earth Dog); 3276 or 3069 |
| Coptic calendar | 294–295 |
| Discordian calendar | 1744 |
| Ethiopian calendar | 570–571 |
| Hebrew calendar | 4338–4339 |
- Hindu calendars
| Vikram Samvat | 634–635 |
| Shaka Samvat | 499–500 |
| Kali Yuga | 3678–3679 |
| Holocene calendar | 10578 |
| Iranian calendar | 44 BP – 43 BP |
| Islamic calendar | 45 BH – 44 BH |
| Javanese calendar | 467–468 |
| Julian calendar | 578; DLXXVIII |
| Korean calendar | 2911 |
| Minguo calendar | 1334 before ROC 民前1334年 |
| Nanakshahi calendar | −890 |
| Seleucid era | 889/890 AG |
| Thai solar calendar | 1120–1121 |
| Tibetan calendar | མེ་མོ་བྱ་ལོ་ (female Fire-Bird); 704 or 323 or −449 — to — ས་ཕོ་ཁྱི་ལོ་ (male Earth-Dog); 705 or 324 or −448 |

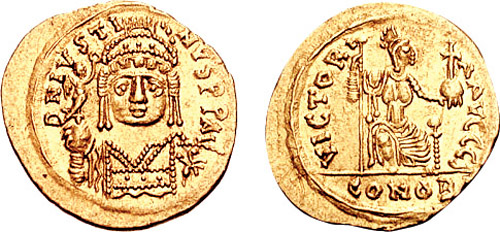
Emperor Justin II (c. 520–578)

Year 578 (DLXXVIII) was a common year starting on Saturday of the Julian calendar. The denomination 578 for this year has been used since the early medieval period, when the Anno Domini calendar era became the prevalent method in Europe for naming years.

== Events ==
=== By place ===
==== Byzantine Empire ====
- Byzantine–Sassanid War: A Byzantine army under command of Maurice (magister militum per Orientem) invades Upper Mesopotamia, and raids on both sides of the Tigris. He deports 70,000 captives from Hyrcania to Cyprus, and installs military colonists to guard the strategic locations.
- October 5 – Emperor Justin II dies after several periods of insanity. On the advice of his wife Sophia, he has raised his general Tiberius to the rank of co-emperor (Caesar). From December 574 he has ruled jointly with Sophia, and now succeeds them as emperor of the Byzantine Empire.

==== Asia ====
- Summer – Emperor Wu Di engages in military campaigns on two fronts: against the invading Göktürks to the north and against the Chen dynasty in the south.
- Wu Di, age 35, dies from an illness, and is succeeded by his eldest son Xuan Di as emperor of Northern Zhou.
- Kongō Gumi, the world's oldest construction company (578–2006), is founded in Osaka (Japan).

==== Central America ====
- October 22 – Tzi-B'alam, who had been the ruler of the Mayan city state of Copán in Honduras, dies after a 25-year reign that began in May 553.
- November 15 – K'ak' Chan Yopaat, becomes the new ruler of the Mayan city state of Copán in Honduras, and rules until his death 49 years later in 628.

== Deaths ==
- July 30 – Jacob Baradaeus, bishop of Edessa
- October 5 – Justin II, Byzantine emperor
- Abdul Muttalib, grandfather of Islamic prophet Muhammad
- Wu Di, emperor of Northern Zhou (b. 543)
- Wu Mingche, general of the Chen dynasty (b. 512)
- Wuffa, king of East Anglia (approximate date)
- Yuwen Xian, prince of Northern Zhou (b. 544)
- Approximate date -
  - Bhavyaviveka, Indian Madhyamaka scholar
  - Hatim al-Tai, Arabian poet
  - John Malalas, Byzantine chronicler (b. c.491)
