= Yuwen Xian =

Yuwen Xian (Chinese: 宇文憲) (545–July 18, 578), Xianbei nickname Pihetu (毗賀突), formally Prince Yang of Qi (齊煬王), was an imperial prince of the Northern Zhou dynasty of China. He was a key official and general during the reign of his brother Emperor Wu, but after Emperor Wu's death he was feared on account of his ability by his nephew Emperor Xuan, who therefore falsely accused him of plotting treason and strangled him.

== Background ==
Yuwen Xian was born in 544, as the fifth son of Yuwen Tai, the paramount general of Western Wei. His mother was Yuwen Tai's concubine Lady Dabugan, who was ethnically Rouran. He was initially created the Duke of Fucheng and was said to be intelligent from his youth, and he and his older brother Yuwen Yong (by another concubine, Lady Chinu) studied the Shi Jing and the Zuo Zhuan together. Once, when Yuwen Tai was giving his sons horses, Yuwen Xian alone picked a multicolored horse. When Yuwen Tai asked him why he did so, he reasoned that in battle, a multicolored horse would be easier to tell apart from others. Yuwen Tai was pleased with the response, and from that point on, whenever he saw multicolored horses, he would award them to Yuwen Xian.

In 553, Western Wei seized the modern Sichuan and Chongqing region from the Liang Dynasty pretender Xiao Ji. While Yuwen Tai initially entrusted the region to his nephew Yuchi Jiong, he wanted to eventually send a son there due to the wealth and strategic importance of the region. He asked his sons who was willing to go—but none responded except Yuwen Xian. Yuwen Tai responded, "A provincial governor needs to pacify the people and rule over them, and you are too young to do that. Based on age, I will pick an older brother of yours." Yuwen Xian responded, "It should be based on ability, not age. If you let me try and I fail, I am willing to be punished." Yuwen Tai was impressed with the response, but did not send him due to his young age, but left instructions for Yuwen Xian to be eventually entrusted with the region. In 554, Yuwen Xian was promoted to the greater title of Duke of Ancheng.

In 556, Yuwen Tai, after entrusting his heir apparent and Yuwen Xian's older brother Yuwen Jue to Yuwen Xian's cousin Yuwen Hu, died. In spring 557, Yuwen Hu forced Emperor Gong of Western Wei to yield the throne to Yuwen Jue, ending Western Wei and establishing Northern Zhou. Yuwen Jue took the throne (as Emperor Xiaomin) with the alternative title of "Heavenly Prince" (Tian Wang), with Yuwen Hu serving as regent. Later that year, Yuwen Jue, trying to seize power from Yuwen Hu, had his plot discovered by Yuwen Hu, and Yuwen Hu deposed and then killed him, replacing him with another older brother of Yuwen Xian's, Yuwen Yu (as Emperor Ming). In 559, Emperor Ming, remembering Yuwen Tai's instruction, put Yuwen Xian in charge of the modern Sichuan and Chongqing region, with his headquarters at Yi Province (roughly modern Chengdu, Sichuan). Yuwen Xian, despite his young age of 15, was said to be a capable governor, paying attention to the people's concerns and to the important matters and making good decisions on legal cases. The people of the region favored him so much that they created monuments for him. Emperor Ming created him the greater title of Duke of Qi.

== During Emperor Wu's reign ==
=== During Yuwen Hu's regency ===
In 560, Yuwen Hu, apprehensive of Emperor Ming's intelligence, poisoned him to death. Emperor Ming, while on his deathbed, designated Yuwen Yong, then the Duke of Lu, the new emperor, and Yuwen Yong took the throne as Emperor Wu. Yuwen Hu resumed his regency. During Emperor Wu's Baoding (保定) era, Yuwen Xian was recalled from his post at Yi Province to be the governor of the capital province of Yong Province (雍州, roughly modern Xi'an, Shaanxi).

In winter 564, when Yuwen Hu, in alliance with Tujue, launched a major attack on rival Northern Qi, Yuwen Xian was sent to command part of the army attacking Luoyang, along with Yuchi Jiong, Daxi Wu (達奚武), and Wang Xiong (王雄). However, the Northern Zhou army was defeated by the Northern Qi army commanded by Duan Shao and Hulü Guang, and Wang was killed, causing the army to panic. Yuwen Xian visited the various army camps and was able to calm the anxious army, and he wanted to resume fighting, but Daxi, as the senior general, judged the situation to be too volatile, and so ordered a withdrawal. From this point on, however, Yuwen Hu entrusted Yuwen Xian with great responsibilities, and he participated in most important decisions. Yuwen Hu often had Yuwen Xian serve as a liaison between himself and Emperor Wu, and Yuwen Xian spent much effort trying to reduce the building tension between the two. By 568, he officially became minister of the army, as well as deputy prime minister (i.e., deputy to Yuwen Hu).

Around the new year 570, Yuwen Xian was sent to try to capture the Northern Qi city of Yiyang (宜陽), near Luoyang, and while he was not successful against Hulü, the armies stalemated. In winter 570, Hulü changed tactics and headed north, encroaching onto Northern Zhou territory north of the Fen River (汾水, flowing through modern Linfen, Shanxi) and seizing substantial amount of territory. Yuwen Hu requested Yuwen Xian's opinion, and Yuwen Xian opined that Yuwen Hu should personally lead an army but stay some distance away from the front, while Yuwen Xian himself would advance and engage Hulü. Yuwen Hu agreed, and Yuwen Xian subsequently won some minor battles against Hulü, eventually causing the armies to again stalemate, although by that point territory had been lost.

=== After Yuwen Hu's death ===
In 572, Emperor Wu, apprehensive of Yuwen Hu, conspired with his brother by the same mother, Yuwen Zhi (宇文直) the Duke of Wei, and they ambushed and killed Yuwen Hu. After Yuwen Hu's death was announced, Yuwen Xian personally met Emperor Wu to apologize for having served under Yuwen Hu. Emperor Wu comforted him and had him take over Yuwen Hu's post of Da Zhongzhai (大冢宰) -- but reduced the power of the post from being prime minister to only being minister of palace affairs, therefore reducing Yuwen Xian's authority while ostensibly promoting him. Yuwen Zhi was still jealous of Yuwen Xian, and several times advised Emperor Wu to execute Yuwen Xian. Emperor Wu refused. In 574, Yuwen Xian's title was changed to Prince of Qi. That year, Yuwen Xian authored a five-volume work on military strategies and offered it to Emperor Wu, and Emperor Wu was pleased with the work.

In fall 574, while Emperor Wu and Yuwen Xian were at Yunyang Palace (雲陽, in modern Xianyang, Shaanxi), Yuwen Zhi took the opportunity to rebel at the capital Chang'an. Emperor Wu commissioned Yuwen Xian with an army to suppress Yuwen Zhi's rebellion, although before Yuwen Xian could get back to Chang'an the rebellion was already put down by the official Yuchi Yun (尉遲運).

In 575, Emperor Wu, secretly planning a major attack on Northern Qi, only conferred with Wang Yi (王誼) and Yuwen Xian while making his plans, and Yuwen Xian greatly supported the plan. Emperor Wu personally attacked Luoyang, but after sieging it for 20 days without capturing it, he grew ill and was forced to withdraw. While Yuwen Xian made some gains on another front, he abandoned the gains and retreated with Emperor Wu.

In winter 576, Emperor Wu again attacked Northern Qi, with Yuwen Xian as one of his major generals. The attack, while initially repelled by Northern Qi, was very successful, and Yuwen Xian greatly contributed to the eventual seizure, around new year 577, of Northern Qi's secondary capital Jinyang (晉陽, in modern Taiyuan, Shanxi). Emperor Wu put Yuwen Xian in charge of the operation against Northern Qi's capital Yecheng (鄴城, in modern Handan, Hebei), although by the time Yuwen Xian arrived at Yecheng, the Northern Qi emperor Gao Wei had already abandoned Yecheng and fled. Subsequently, Northern Zhou forces were able to capture Gao Wei. Yuwen Xian's army was said to be so disciplined that the people of Northern Qi were barely disturbed by them.

Meanwhile, however, Gao Wei's uncle Gao Jie (高湝) the Prince of Rencheng and cousin Gao Xiaoheng (高孝珩) the Prince of Guangning were still at Xindu (信都, in modern Hengshui, Hebei) and resisting Northern Zhou forces. Emperor Wu sent Yuwen Xian to attack Xindu. Yuwen Xian sent a letter from Gao Wei and wrote a letter himself, both trying to persuade Gao Jie to surrender, but Gao Jie refused. Yuwen Xian, however, was able to defeat Gao Jie and Gao Xiaoheng, capturing them. Impressed with their bravery, he personally treated them with respect, even personally attending to Gao Xiaoheng's wounds. Subsequently, Yuwen Xian also defeated the Xiongnu tribal chief Liu Moduo (劉沒鐸), who had claimed imperial title, and captured Liu.

In 578, Emperor Wu was launching a campaign against Tujue, but Yuwen Xian, apprehensive of his own successes on the battlefield, declined a commission from Emperor Wu to lead the army, making an excuse that he had a skin disorder that made it difficult for him to attend to the army. Before Emperor Wu actually launched the campaign, however, he fell ill and died, and was succeeded by his son and crown prince Yuwen Yun (as Emperor Xuan).

== Death ==
Emperor Xuan, who was erratic in his behavior, greatly suspected Yuwen Xian on account of his ability. He initially asked the official Yuwen Xiaobo (宇文孝伯) to ambush Yuwen Xian, but Yuwen Xiaobo refused, he instead plotted with his associates Yu Zhi (于智) and Zheng Yi (鄭譯). One month after Emperor Wu's death, Emperor Xuan summoned his uncles to the palace under the pretense of giving them new commissions, but took the opportunity to ambush and capture Yuwen Xian. Emperor Xuan then had Yu accuse Yuwen Xian of treason. Yuwen Xian refuted each accusation, but was still strangled to death. Yuwen Xian's friends Wang Xing (王興), Dugu Xiong (獨孤雄), and Doulu Shao (豆盧紹) were also executed under false accusations of conspiring with Yuwen Xian, as were Yuwen Xian's sons.
