= Collatio lustralis =

Tax in the Roman Empire

The collatio lustralis was a tax on "traders in the widest sense" in the Roman Empire. It was instituted by Constantine, although there are some indications that such a tax existed during the reign of Caligula (see Suetonius, Lives of the Twelve Caesars). It applied to both the Western and Eastern Empire. It was originally collected in both gold and silver, but only in gold beginning in the late 4th century. Like many Roman taxes, it was collected not annually, but (originally) every four years.

It applied to all merchants, money-lenders, craftsmen, and others who received fees for their work, including prostitutes. The only initial exemptions were physicians, teachers, and farmers selling their own produce.

== Western Empire ==
The tax continued in the West in the Ostrogothic and Visigothic kingdoms that succeeded the Empire.

== Eastern Roman Empire ==
In the Eastern Roman (Byzantine) Empire, this tax was known as the chrysargyron (Greek: χρυσάργυρον), also called chrysargyrum. The term originated from the Greek words for gold (χρυσός) and silver (ἄργυρος), which initially were the required forms of payment.

According to the early Byzantine writer Zosimus, Emperor Constantine I first initiated this tax, perhaps as early as 325. Also there are hints that the tax existed during the rule of Severus Alexander (see Augustan History). The ecclesiastical historian Evagrius says that Constantine found the tax already established in the Eastern Empire, and considered abolishing it.

Early in the 5th century, the tax had to be paid every four years. In some areas it was collected by indiction year, every month. Each city chose individuals to collect the taxes from the community, which were then paid into the sacrae largitiones.

Libanius, Zosimus and Evagrius list examples of the hardships caused by this tax, probably because it was collected in one lump sum every four years. Parents were forced to sell their children into slavery or prostitution to meet the required levy.

The tax was abolished by Anastasius I throughout the Eastern Roman Empire in the year 498 as part of his fiscal and monetary reforms. In the Italian peninsula, then ruled by the Ostrogoths, the tax was continued for some years, until they were conquered by Belisarius. According to Joshua the Stylite, when the tax was ended, the people of the city of Edessa, which was relieved of a tax of 140 pounds of gold every 4 years (2,520 solidi annually), celebrated with a week of festivities.

The Emperor Anastasius compensated for this lost revenue by placing income earned from certain estates into a separate fund.
