= Claudiopolis (Cataonia) =

Ancient city in Cataonia

Claudiopolis (Greek: Κλαυδιόπολις, city of Claudius) was an ancient city of Cataonia mentioned by Ptolemy (v. 7).Its name suggests that it was named for the Roman emperor Claudius.
