= 483 =

Calendar year

483 in various calendars
Gregorian calendar	483; CDLXXXIII
Ab urbe condita	1236
Assyrian calendar	5233
Balinese saka calendar	404–405
Bengali calendar	−111 – −110
Berber calendar	1433
Buddhist calendar	1027
Burmese calendar	−155
Byzantine calendar	5991–5992
Chinese calendar	壬戌年 (Water Dog); 3180 or 2973 — to — 癸亥年 (Water Pig); 3181 or 2974
Coptic calendar	199–200
Discordian calendar	1649
Ethiopian calendar	475–476
Hebrew calendar	4243–4244
- Hindu calendars
Vikram Samvat	539–540
Shaka Samvat	404–405
Kali Yuga	3583–3584
Holocene calendar	10483
Iranian calendar	139 BP – 138 BP
Islamic calendar	143 BH – 142 BH
Javanese calendar	369–370
Julian calendar	483; CDLXXXIII
Korean calendar	2816
Minguo calendar	1429 before ROC 民前1429年
Nanakshahi calendar	−985
Seleucid era	794/795 AG
Thai solar calendar	1025–1026
Tibetan calendar	ཆུ་ཕོ་ཁྱི་ལོ་ (male Water-Dog); 609 or 228 or −544 — to — ཆུ་མོ་ཕག་ལོ་ (female Water-Boar); 610 or 229 or −543

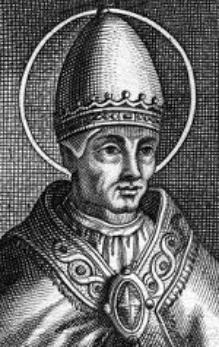
Pope Felix III (483–492)

Year 483 (CDLXXXIII) was a common year starting on Saturday of the Julian calendar. At the time, it was known in the Roman Empire as the Year of the Consulship of Aginantius without colleague (or, less frequently, year 1236 Ab urbe condita). The denomination 483 for this year has been used since the early medieval period, when the Anno Domini calendar era became the prevalent method in Europe for naming years.

== Events ==
=== By place ===
==== Byzantine Empire ====
- Byzantine general Illus (magister officiorum), and Verina (widow of the late emperor Leo I), attempt to overthrow Emperor Zeno and place another general named Leontius on the throne.

==== Europe ====
- The Ostrogoths are given status as foederati; they control a large part of Macedonia and Thrace (Balkans).

=== By topic ===
==== Religion ====
- March 10 – Pope Simplicius dies at Rome after a 15-year reign, and is succeeded by Felix III as the 48th pope; Rome is without a pope for 10 days in the interim. Felix III is a widower with two children.

== Births ==
- Xiao Baojuan, emperor of Southern Qi (d. 501)
- Xuan Wu Di, emperor of Northern Wei (d. 515)
- Yuan Xun, crown prince of Northern Wei (d. 497)
- Zhu Yi, high official of Southern Liang (d. 549)

== Deaths ==
- March 10 – Pope Simplicius
- Crimthann mac Énnai, king of Leinster (Ireland)
