= Isaurian War =

492–497 war

Date	492–497
Location	Isauria
Result	Eastern Roman victory

Belligerents
Eastern Roman Empire; Huns	Isaurian rebels

Commanders and leaders
John the Scythian; John the Hunchback; Diogenianus; Sigizan; Zolban	Longinus of Cardala; Lilingis; Conon; Longinus of Selinus; Athenodorus; Indes

Strength
Unknown	Unknown

Casualties and losses
Unknown	Unknown, most likely higher

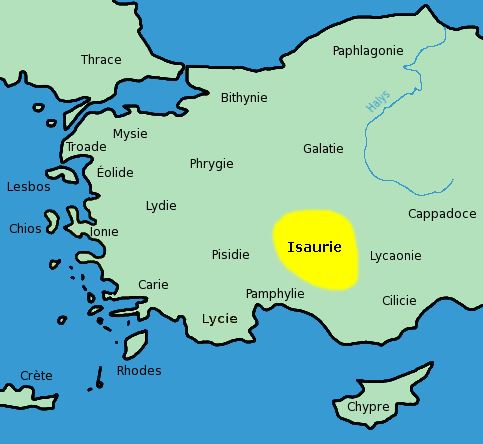
Map of Isauria

The Isaurian War was a conflict that lasted from 492 to 497 and that was fought between the army of the Eastern Roman Empire and the rebels of Isauria. At the end of the war, Eastern Emperor Anastasius I regained control of the Isauria region and the leaders of the revolt were killed.

== Background ==
During the reign of Theodosius II (r. 402–450) people from Isauria, a poor and mountainous province in Asia Minor, reached for the first time high office in the Eastern Roman Empire. Emperor Leo I (r. 457–474) deliberately promoted Isaurians to important posts in the civil and military administration to counterbalance the power of the hitherto all-powerful Germanic elements. The Isaurians, however, were despised as semi-barbarians by the people of Constantinople, who in 473 rose in an anti-Isaurian revolt in the Hippodrome and in 475 overthrew the newly crowned Isaurian emperor Zeno (r. 474–475 and 476–491), killing all the Isaurians in the city in the process.

Zeno returned to the throne in 476, however, this time until his death in 491. Under this emperor, his fellow Isaurians prospered, and the opposition to them, although growing, remained latent. In 484, the Isaurian magister militum Illus rebelled against Zeno and fled to the East, where he supported the usurpation of Leontius. That, however, ended in 488 with the capture and execution of both rebel leaders.

== Conflict ==
In 491 Emperor Zeno died and was succeeded by the silentiarius Anastasius I, chosen by Empress Ariadne. During the brief interregnum, the Constantinopolitan populace had made its views on the succession clear by cries in the Hippodrome demanding a "Roman emperor", thus rejecting the possible succession of Longinus, Zeno's brother. In the same year, anti-Isaurian riots broke out in the Hippodrome, and Anastasius exiled Longinus and several other Isaurians, including general Longinus of Cardala.

In 492 the Isaurians began a revolt, but in the same year their joint forces were defeated by the Roman army, led by generals John the Scythian and John Gibbo (John the Hunchback), at Kotyaion in Phrygia (battle of Cotyaeum). Lilingis, a leading figure in the revolt, died after the battle. The Isaurian survivors took refuge in the mountain strongholds of their country and kept waging war.

In 493 the Roman general Diogenianus captured Claudiopolis but was besieged there by the Isaurians, led by the ex-bishop Conon. To his help came John Gibbo who forced the passes and, helped by a sortie of Diogenianus', won an overwhelming victory against the Isaurians, in which Conon died.

From 494 to 497 the Isaurians closed themselves in their fortresses in the Isaurian mountains, where they were kept supplied by Longinus of Selinus through the port of Antioch.

In 497 John the Scythian killed Longinus of Cardala and Athenodorus, whose heads were exposed on a spear in Tarsus, thus effectively ending the war. In 498, John Gibbo captured the last enemy leaders, Longinus of Selinus and Indes, and sent them to the Emperor, who paraded them along the main road of Constantinople to the Hippodrome, where they had to perform the proskynesis in front of the imperial kathisma.

== Aftermath ==
In 495, Emperor Anastasius I told Patriarch Euphemius that he was tired of war. Euphemius reported this to John, the son-in-law of the Isaurian leader Athenodorus, who referred it back to Anastasius. The emperor had come into conflict with Euphemius before ascending to the throne; furthermore, Anastasius, who had Monophysite sympathies, had been forced by Euphemius to sign a declaration of orthodoxy before being crowned. For these reasons he decided to accuse Euphemius of treason for revealing plans to the enemy. In 496, Euphemius was excommunicated and deposed.

After the war Anastasius rewarded his generals with the consulship: John the Scythian held the post in 498 and John Gibbo in 499. Anastasius also ordered the architect Aetherius to build the Chalke Gate to the Great Palace of Constantinople to celebrate the victory, and the poet Christodorus commemorated the war in a now-lost poem in six books, entitled Isaurica.

== Bibliography ==
- John Bagnell Bury, History of the Later Roman Empire, BiblioBazaar, LLC, 2009, ISBN 1-113-20102-9, p. 433.
- Brian Croke, Count Marcellinus and His Chronicle, Oxford University Press, 2001, ISBN 0-19-815001-6, pp. 137-138.
- Jones, Arnold Hugh Martin, John Robert Martindale, John Morris, "Fl. Ioannes qui et Gibbus 93", The Prosopography of the Later Roman Empire, volume 2, Cambridge University Press, 1992, ISBN 0-521-20159-4, pp. 617-618.
