= Battle of Cotyaeum =

492 battle

Coordinates: 39°25′00″N 29°59′00″E

- Part of Isaurian War
Date	492
Location	Cotyaeum (modern Kütahya)
Result	Byzantine victory

Belligerents
Byzantine Empire	Isaurian rebels

Commanders and leaders
John the Scythian, John the Hunchback, Justin	Longinus of Cardala, Conon Fuscianus, Longinus of Selinus, Lilingis †
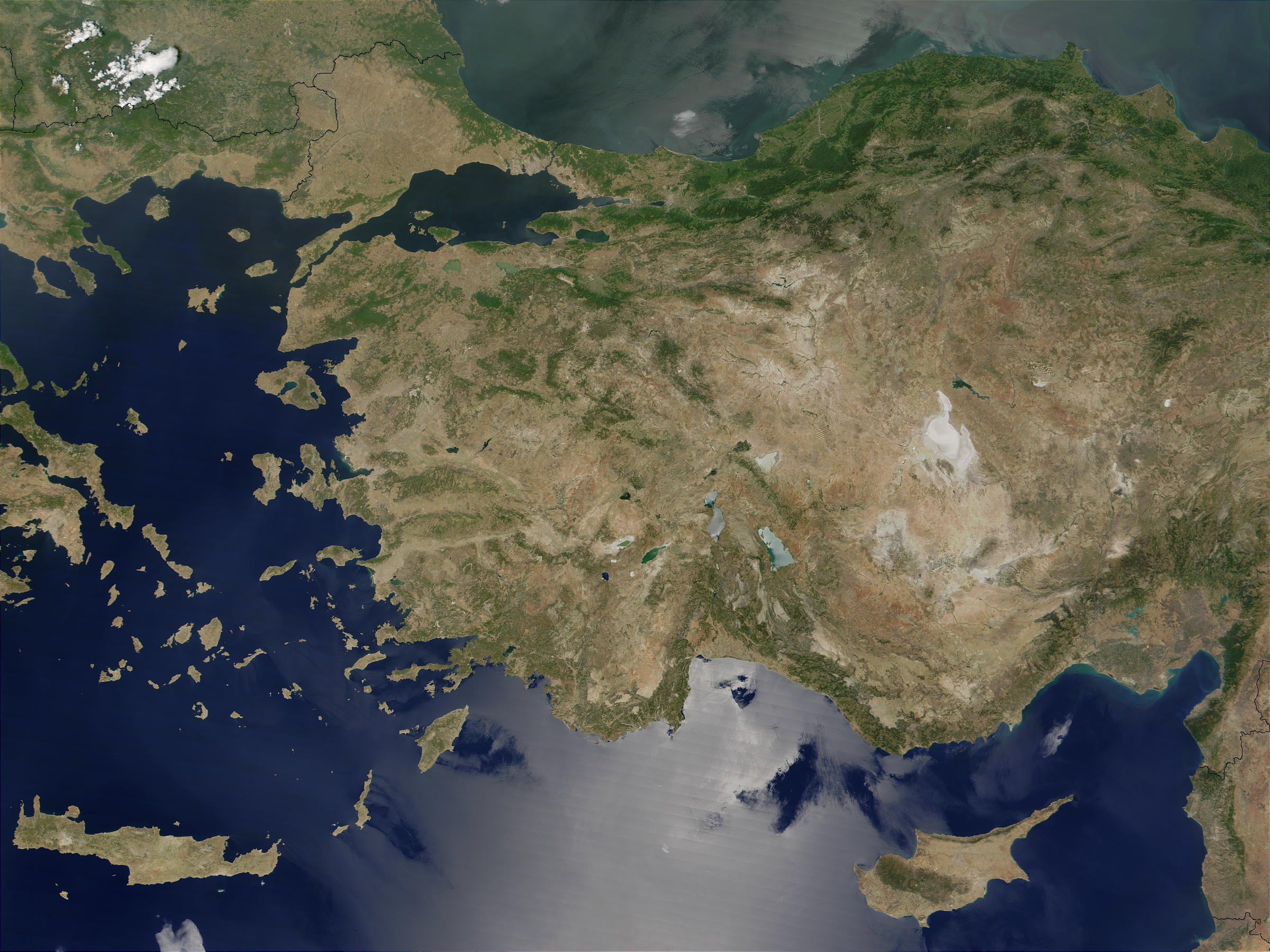
- Location within Asia Minor

The Battle of Cotyaeum (modern Kütahya) of 492 CE was a major engagement is the Isaurian War fought in Phrygia Epictetus. The future Byzantine emperor Justin I was present at the battle as a subordinate commander.

In 2015 a mass grave containing around sixty skeletons was found in Kütahya, believed to be of Roman date. Investigations are ongoing as to whether these skeletons are victims of the Isaurian War or the Battle of Cotyaeum.
