= John the Scythian =

Former byzantine officer and consul

John the Scythian (Latin: Iohannes Scytha, Greek: Ἰωάννης ὁ Σκύθης; floruit 482–498) was a general and a politician of the Eastern Roman Empire who fought against the usurper Leontius (484–488) and in the Isaurian War (492–497).

== Biography ==
John was an officer of the East Roman army. In 482, he was sent to Illyricum together with Moschianus to fight the Ostrogoths of Theodoric the Amal.

In 483, the Emperor Zeno decided to get rid of his magister militum per Orientem ("Commander in Chief of the East") Illus, replacing him with John.

In 484, Illus rebelled and put forward the civil officer Leontius as emperor. John and Theodoric, with a large army, defeated Illus and Leontius near Antioch in September of that year. The two rebels fled to Isauria and holed up in the fortress of Papurius. John laid siege to the fortress; towards the end of 484, he captured and killed Trocundus, Illus' brother, who had gone out to seek reinforcements. The siege lasted until 488, when the fortress fell to treachery and both Illus and Leontius were put to death.

During the reign of Emperor Anastasius I, John fought in the Isaurian War (492–497), obtaining a joint command of the army with John the Hunchback. He was one of Roman commanders in the battle of Cotyaeum of 492, while in 497 defeated the Isaurians, capturing and killing their leaders Longinus of Cardala and Athenodorus, and sending their heads to Constantinople.

Anastasius was very pleased with the victory and honored his generals. John the Scythian was appointed consul for 498, while John the Hunchback was given the consulship for 499.

== Bibliography ==
- Martindale, John R., ed. (1980). "Ioannes Scytha 34". The Prosopography of the Later Roman Empire: Volume II, AD 395–527. Cambridge: Cambridge University Press. pp. 602–603. ISBN 0-521-20159-4.

Political offices
Preceded by Flavius Anastasius Augustus II, II post consulatum Viatoris (West)	Consul of the Roman Empire; 498 with Flavius Paulinus	Succeeded by Flavius Iohannes Gibbus, Post consulatum Paulinii (West)
