= John the Hunchback =

Former byzantine general and consul

John the Hunchback or John Gibbo (Greek: Ἰωάννης ὁ Κυρτός; Latin: Flavius Ioannes qui est Gibbus; fl. 492–499) was a general and a politician of the Eastern Roman Empire.

== Biography ==
John was a native of Selymbria, modern Silivri in Turkey.

Between 492 and 499, he was magister militum praesentalis. In this capacity he was one of two generals of Emperor Anastasius I (r. 491–518) in the Isaurian War of 492–497, along with John the Scythian. In 492 he was one of the commanders of the Roman army at the Battle of Cotyaeum, while the following year he won an overwhelming victory against the Isaurians, after having freed the army of Diogenianus at Claudiopolis. In 498, the year after the victory over the Isaurians, it was John who captured the last enemy leaders, Longinus of Selinus and Indes, and sent them to the Emperor.

Anastasius was very pleased with the victory, and amply rewarded his victorious generals: John the Scythian was made consul for 498, while John the Hunchback held the consulate sine collegis in 499.

According to a story passed down by Procopius of Caesarea (Anecdotes, VI.5-9), John sentenced the officer Justin to death during the Isaurian War, but following a dream, decided to spare his life. After the death of Anastasius, Justin ascended the throne and ruled until his death in 527.

== Bibliography ==
- Martindale, John R., ed. (1980). "Fl. Ioannes qui et Gibbus 93". The Prosopography of the Later Roman Empire: Volume II, AD 395–527. Cambridge: Cambridge University Press. pp. 617–618. ISBN 0-521-20159-4.

Preceded by Flavius Paulinus, Iohannes Scytha	Consul of the Roman Empire; 499 with Post consulatum Paulinii (West)	Succeeded by Flavius Patricius, Flavius Hypatius
