= Claudiopolis (Cappadocia) =

Ancient city of Cappadocia

Claudiopolis (Greek: Κλαυδιόπολις, city of Claudius) was an ancient city of Cappadocia mentioned by Pliny (v. 24). From its name one can adduce that it was named for Roman emperor Claudius.

In 493, during the Isaurian War (492–497), the Roman general Diogenianus besieged Claudiopolis, but his army was blocked by the Isaurians. In his help came John Gibbo, who won an overwhelming victory against the Isaurians.
