= Anastasius I Dicorus =

Roman emperor from 491 to 518

- Solidus of Anastasius I, marked:d·n· anastasius p·p· aug·

Eastern Roman emperor
- Reign: 11 April 491 – 9 July 518
- Predecessor: Zeno
- Successor: Justin I
- Born: c. 430; Dyrrhachium, Rome
- Died: 9 July 518 (aged 87–88); Constantinople, Rome
- Burial: Church of the Holy Apostles
- Spouse: Ariadne
Regnal name
- Latin: Imperator Caesar Flavius Anastasius Augustus; Ancient Greek: Αὐτοκράτωρ καῖσαρ Φλάβιος Ἀναστάσιος αὔγουστος
- Dynasty: Leonid
- Religion: Non-Chalcedonian Christianity

Anastasius I Dicorus (Ancient Greek: Ἀναστάσιος, romanized: Anastásios, Latin: Anastasius; c. 430 – 9 July 518) was Eastern Roman emperor from 491 to 518. A career civil servant, he came to the throne at the age of 61 after being chosen by Ariadne, the wife of his predecessor, Zeno. His reign was characterized by reforms and improvements in the empire's government, finances, economy and bureaucracy. The resulting stable government, reinvigorated monetary economy and sizeable budget surplus allowed the empire to pursue more ambitious policies under his successors, most notably Justinian I. Since many of Anastasius's reforms proved long-lasting, his influence over the empire endured for centuries.

Anastasius was a Monophysite Christian. His personal religious tendencies caused tensions throughout his reign, in an empire that was becoming increasingly divided along religious lines. He was the last non-Chalcedonian to rule the Byzantine Empire (although Heraclius similarly tried to push a middle ground belief, namely Monothelitism, to unite the Monophysites, Miaphysites and Diophysites of the empire, but was also ultimately unsuccessful and condemned by the Orthodox Church).

== Early life and family ==
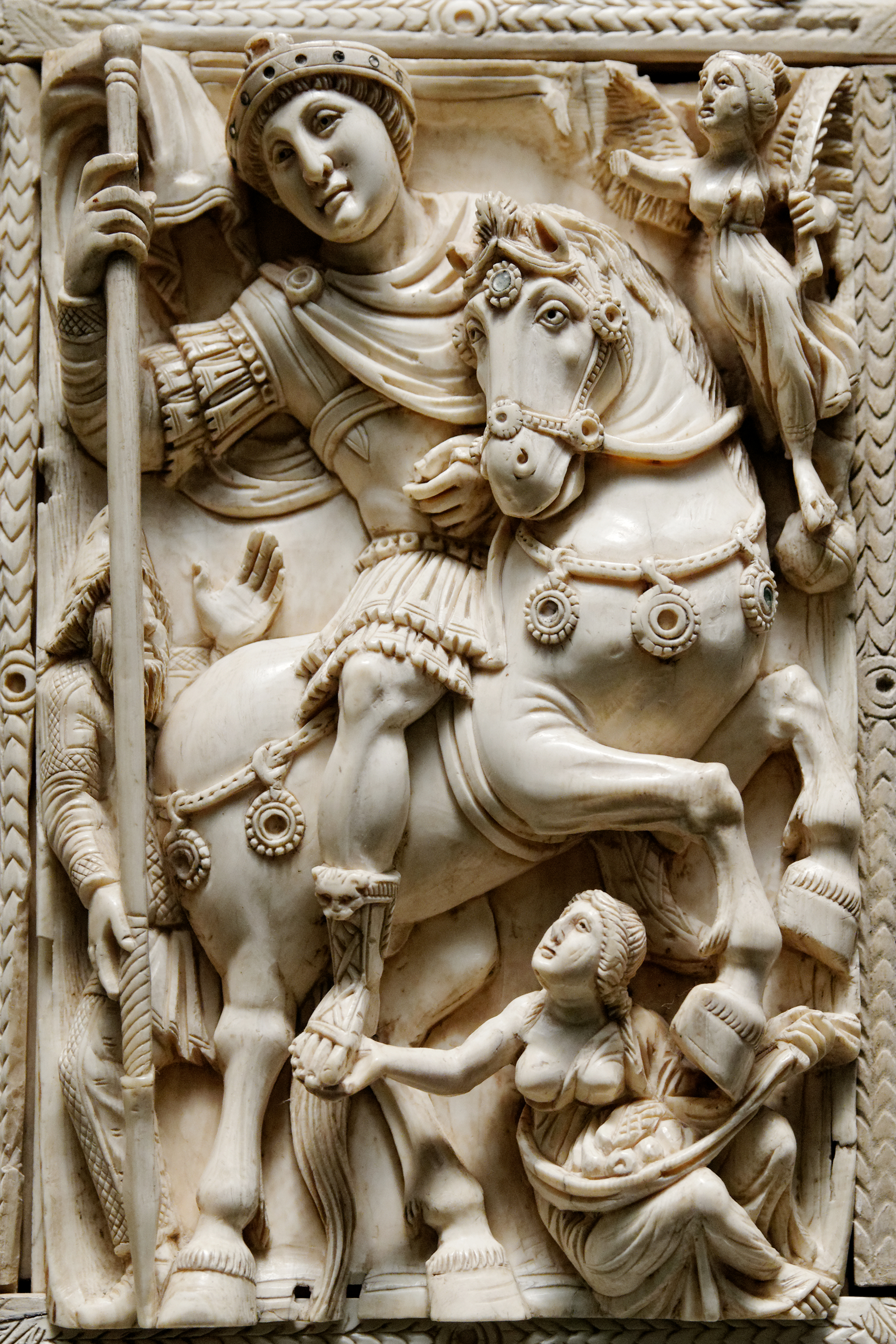
The Barberini ivory, a 6th-century ivory diptych representing either Anastasius or Justinian I

Anastasius was born at Dyrrachium; the date is unknown, but is thought to have been no later than 431. He was born into an Illyro-Roman family. Anastasius had one black eye and one blue eye (heterochromia), and for that reason he was nicknamed Dicorus (Ancient Greek: Δίκορος, romanized: Díkoros, "two-pupiled"). Before becoming emperor, Anastasius was a silentiary.

Anastasius is known to have had a brother named Paulus, who served as consul in 496. With a woman known as Magna, Paulus was father to Irene, who married Olybrius. This Olybrius was the son of Anicia Juliana and Areobindus Dagalaifus Areobindus. The daughter of Olybrius and Irene was named Proba. She married Probus and was mother to a younger Juliana. This younger Juliana married her possible relative another Anastasius, son of Anastasius and maternal grandson of Theodora, and was mother of Areobindus, Placidia, and a younger Proba, who married (Flavius) Anastasius, born in 530, and mothered Areobindus, born in 550, and Placidia, born in 552 and wife of John Mystacon. Another nephew of Anastasius was Probus, consul in 502. Anastasius's sister, Caesaria, married Secundinus, and gave birth to Hypatius and Pompeius. Anastasius, consul in 518, was a great-nephew of Anastasius. His daughter Juliana later married Marcellus, a brother of Justin II. The extensive family may well have included several viable candidates for the throne.

Historian Anthony Kaldellis notes that Anastasius, while he had no apparent need to emphasize his origin, proclaimed after his coronation, in an attempt to prove his Romanness, that his family had a noble Roman lineage, tracing their descent back to the Roman general Pompey the Great.

== Emperor ==
=== Accession ===
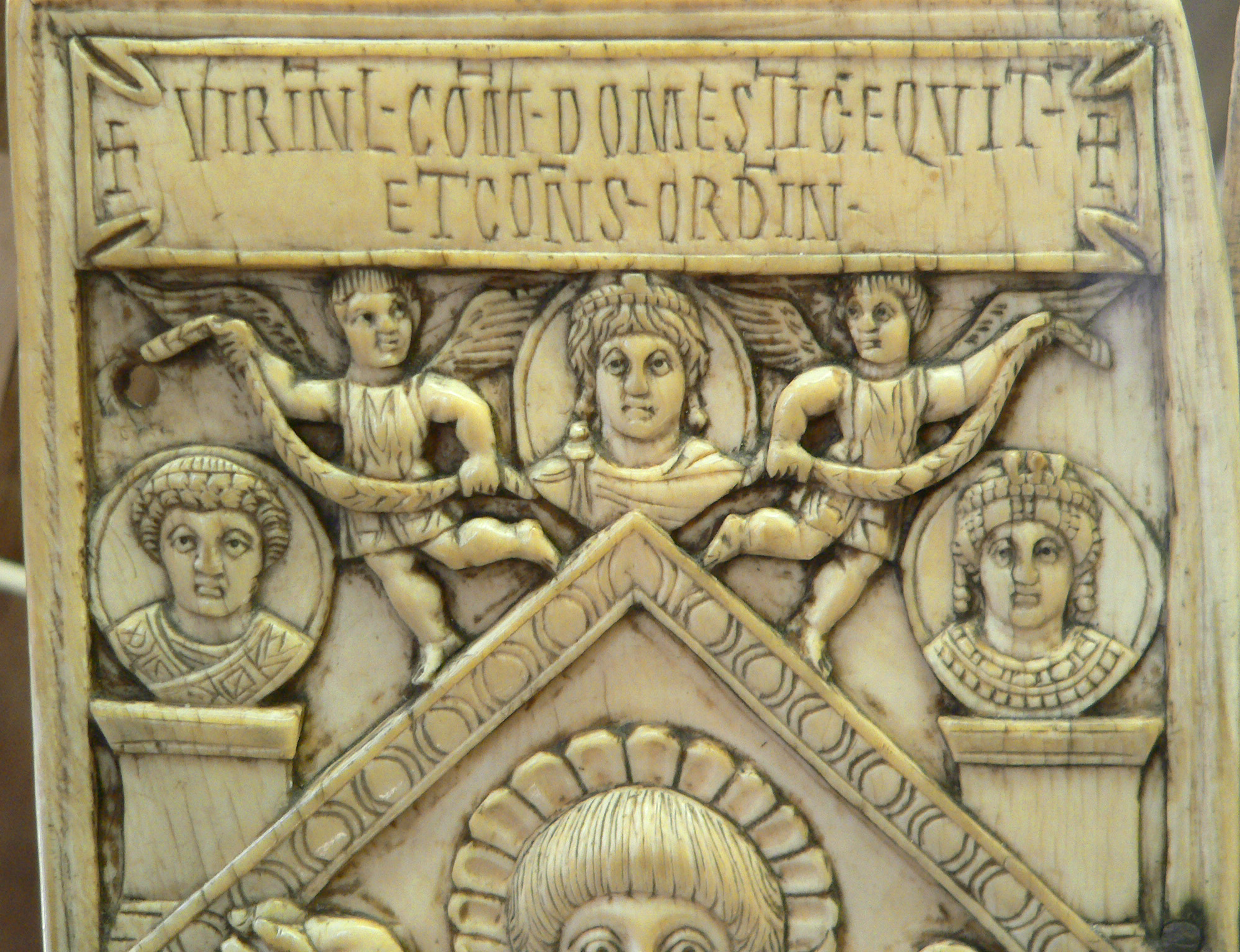
Anastasius I (center) alongside his wife Ariadne (right) on the consular diptych of his grandnephew Sabinianus Anastasius (AD 517). The third figure may be the co-consul Agapitus.

In the weeks following the death of Zeno (491), crowds gathered in the Hippodrome of Constantinople and demanded a Chalcedonian and properly Roman successor, chanting "Give the Empire an Orthodox emperor! Give the Empire a Roman Emperor!" Under such pressure, Ariadne, Zeno's widow, turned to Anastasius. Anastasius was in his sixties at the time of his ascension to the throne. Ariadne chose Anastasius over Zeno's brother Longinus, which upset the Isaurians. Once he took office, Anastasius exiled Longinus and purged a number of Isaurian officials from government. Religiously, Anastasius's sympathies were with the Monophysites. Consequently, as a condition of his accession, the patriarch of Constantinople required that he pledge not to repudiate the Council of Chalcedon.

Ariadne married Anastasius on 20 May 491, shortly after his accession on 11 April. He gained popular favour by a judicious remission of taxation, in particular by abolishing the hated tax on receipts, which was mostly paid by the poor. He displayed great vigour and energy in administering the affairs of the empire. His reforms improved the empire's tax base and pulled it from financial depression and bleak morale. By the end of his reign, it is claimed that the treasury had a 320,000-lb gold reserve.

Not long after his accession, the circus factions caused riots and set fires around the Hippodrome. Though its exact cause is unclear, the riot was pacified when Anastasius replaced the city prefect Julian with his brother-in-law Secundinus.

=== Foreign policy and wars ===
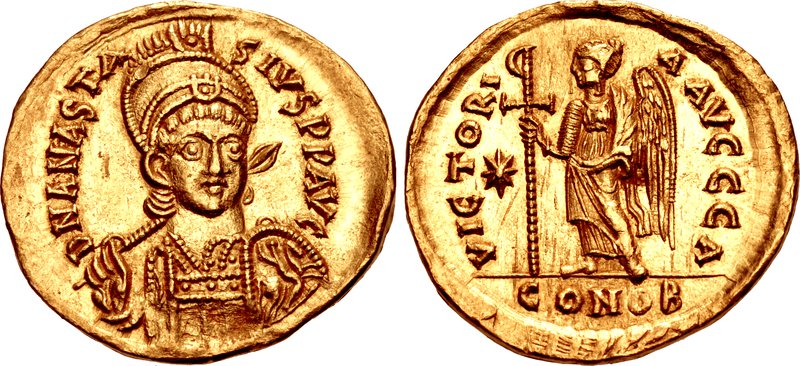
Gold solidus of Anastasius I

Under Anastasius, the empire engaged in the Isaurian War against Longinus and the Anastasian War against Sassanid Persia.

The Isaurian War (492–497) was instigated by the Isaurian supporters of Longinus, the brother of Zeno, who was passed over for the throne in favour of Anastasius, and local discontents. The banished Isaurian officials, led by the ex-bishop Conon and former governor Lilingis, gathered in Isauria and mounted a revolt. Their defeat by John the Scythian and John the Hunchback in the Battle of Cotyaeum in 492 broke the back of the revolt, but guerrilla warfare continued in the Isaurian Mountains for several years. The resistance hinged upon the Isaurians' retention of the mountain strongholds. Anastasius passed economic legislations in the mid-490s, which suggests that the war did not absorb all of the energy and resources of the government. After five years, the Isaurian resistance was broken. Large numbers of Isaurians were forcibly relocated to Thrace to ensure that they would not revolt again.

During the Anastasian War of 502–505 against the Sassanid Persians, the Sassanids captured the cities of Theodosiopolis and Amida, although the Romans later received Amida in exchange for gold. The Persian provinces also suffered severely, and a peace was concluded in 506. Anastasius afterward built the strong fortress of Daras, which was named Anastasiopolis, to hold the Persians at Nisibis in check. The Balkan provinces were denuded of troops, however, and were devastated by invasions of Bulgars. To protect Constantinople and its vicinity against them, Anastasius built the Anastasian Wall, extending from the Propontis to the Black Sea. He converted his birthplace, Dyrrachium, into one of the most fortified cities on the Adriatic with the construction of Durrës Castle.

Once the relationship between the Romans and the Ostrogoths was restored, Italy was independently governed by the Ostrogothic ruler Theodoric, but under the conditions agreed upon with Anastasius, Theodoric could not make laws, mint his own coins nor appoint Goths to the consulship and civil offices. However, he had the right to promulgate edicts, and appoint Romans to the consulship and civil offices and Goths to the military offices. Theodoric forged a relationship with the Visigothic king Alaric II in Gaul. Anastasius became wary of Theodoric's imperial ambition in the West. In the Frankish rex Clovis, the emperor found an ally. Partly thanks to the former magister militum Gundobad, he teamed up with Clovis to overthrow the Gothic hegemony in the West. In the Franco–Gothic War (507–511), Clovis defeated the Visigoths at the Battle of Vouillé. The threat of an invasion by the Roman army had prevented Theodoric from intervening in the battle on time to support the Visigoths in 507. In early 508, a Roman attack actually took place in the Italian peninsula. Anastasius had sent an expeditionary force of 8,000 soldiers for this attack, but the Roman intervention was not aimed at conquest, since it did not seek a confrontation with Theodoric's army and limited itself only to the looting of some cities in the south. The Franks were thus more successful in the war.

=== Domestic and ecclesiastical policies ===
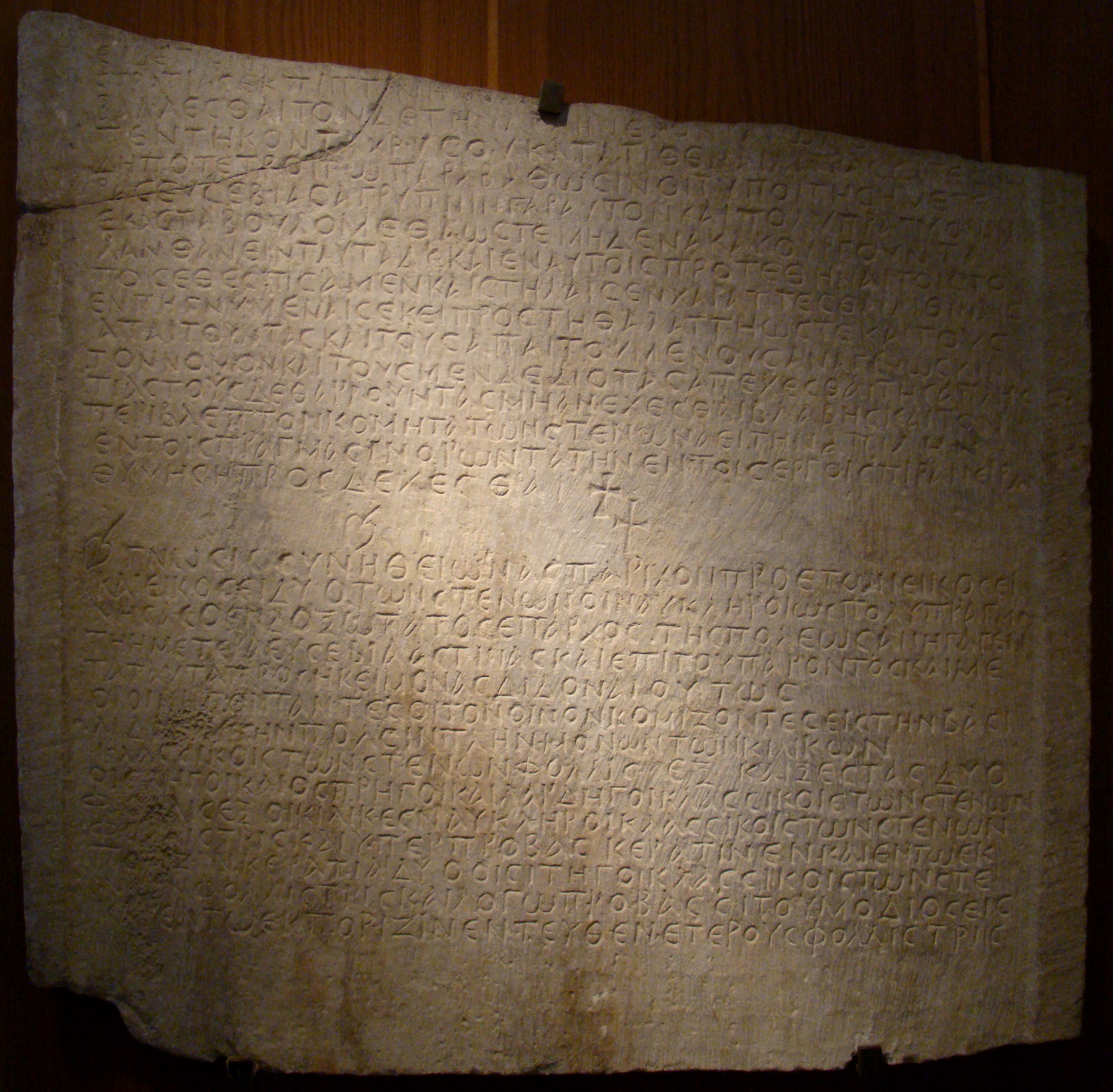
Law of Anastasius regulating passage through the Dardanelles

Anastasius was a convinced Monophysite, but his ecclesiastical policy was moderate. He endeavoured to maintain the principle of the Henotikon of Zeno and the peace of the church. Yet, in 512, perhaps emboldened after his military success against the Persians, Anastasius deposed the Metropolitan of Chalcedon and replaced him with a Monophysite. That violated his agreement with the Patriarch of Constantinople and precipitated riots in Chalcedon. The following year, the general Vitalian started a rebellion, quickly defeated an imperial army and marched on Constantinople. With the army closing in, Anastasius gave Vitalian the title of Commander of the Army of Thrace and began communicating with the Pope on a potential end to the Acacian schism. Two years later, General Marinus attacked Vitalian and forced him and his troops to the northern part of Thrace. After the conclusion of the conflict, Anastasius had undisputed control of the empire until his death in 518.

=== Fiscal and administrative reform ===
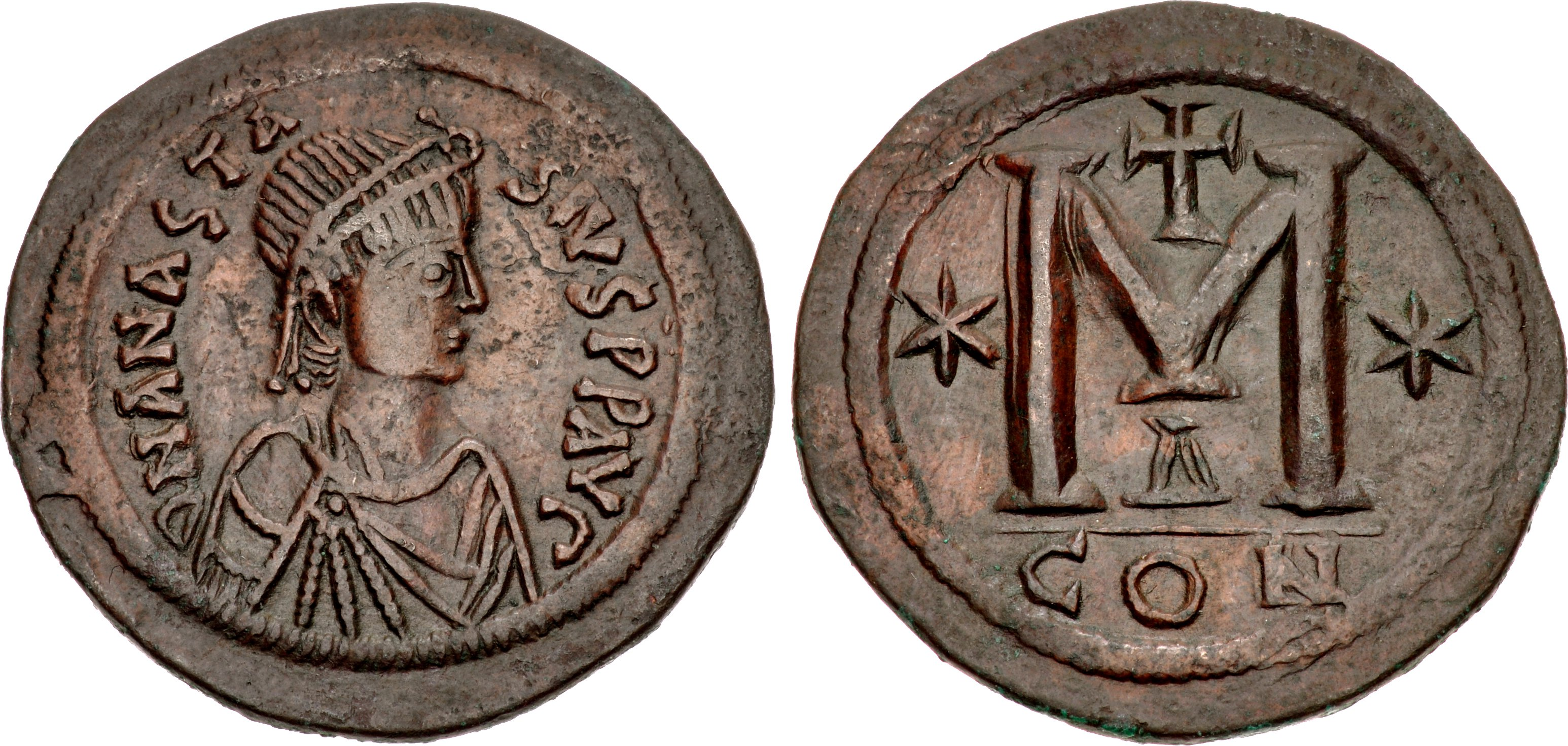
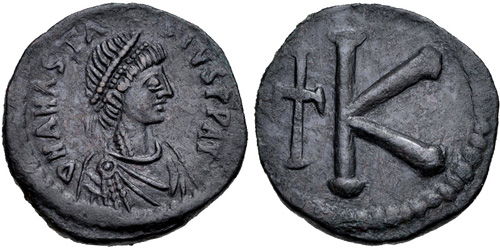
Copper coins from Anastasius I's reign. A follis (40 nummi) on top and a half follis (20 nummi) on bottom. The value of the coins are indicated with Greek numerals where M = 40 and K = 20.

Anastasius showed an interest in administrative efficiency and issues concerning the economy. Whenever it was possible in governmental transactions, he altered the method of payment from goods to hard currency. This practice decreased the potential for embezzlement and the need for transportation and storage of supplies. It also allowed for easier accounting. He also applied this practice to taxes, mandating that taxes be paid with cash rather than with goods. He eliminated the practice of providing soldiers with their arms and uniforms; instead he allotted each soldier a generous sum of money with which to purchase their own. These changes to imperial policy seemed beneficial; taxpayers often paid smaller tax bills than they had before, while government revenue increased. The increase in revenue allowed the emperor to pay soldiers a higher wage, which attracted native Roman soldiers to the military, as opposed to the barbarian and Isaurian mercenaries which some previous emperors had been forced to rely on. Anastasius is often cited for his "prudent management" of the empire's finances.

Upon the conclusion of the Isaurian war, Anastasius abolished the highly unpopular chrysargyron tax on merchants and traders in 498. A great public spectacle was made of Anastasius burning all the paperwork associated with this tax, while the inhabitants of Edessa dressed in white and went to church, singing their thanks to the emperor. The bureau of the sacrae largitiones, a senior fiscal official which had previously collected the revenue from this tax, was compensated by the transferral of funds directly from the res privata, or personal estate of the emperor, in a "magnificent example of his generosity".

Amidst these reforms, though, Anastasius continued the practice of selling official positions. He sold so many that he has been accused of having facilitated the creation of a civilian aristocracy. This claim is strengthened by the growth in influence of families that often held high level positions in the government, such as the Apiones from Egypt. This has puzzled historians, given that the emperor seems to have minimised government corruption/inefficiency in other areas. Anastasius I also gave official positions to his close friend General Celer, his brother-in-law, his brother, his nephews, and his grand-nephews.

The complex monetary system of the early Byzantine Empire, which suffered a partial collapse in the mid-5th century, was revived by Anastasius in 498. The new system involved three denominations of gold, the solidus and its half (semissis) and third (tremissis); and five denominations of copper, the follis (worth 40 nummi) and its fractions down to a nummus. It would seem that the new currency quickly became an important part of trade with other regions. A follis coin has been found in the Charjou desert, north of the River Oxus. Four solidi from his reign have been recovered as far from the Roman Empire as China. China might seem an unlikely trading partner, but the Romans and the Chinese were probably able to do business via Central Asian merchants travelling along the Silk Roads. Some Roman trading partners attempted to replicate the coins of Anastasius. The currency created by Anastasius stayed in use and circulated widely for long after his reign.

== Death and succession ==
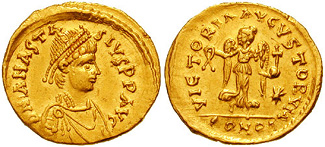
Gold tremissis (one-third of a solidus) of Anastasius I

The Anonymous Valesianus gives a (most likely fictional) account of Anastasius attempting to predict his successor. Anastasius did not know which of his three nephews would succeed him and so he put a message under one of three couches and had his nephews take seats in the room. He believed that the nephew who sat on the couch with the message would be his heir. However, two of his nephews sat on the same couch, and the one with the concealed message remained empty. After putting the matter to God in prayer, he determined that the first person to enter his room the next morning would be the next emperor, and that person turned out to be Justin, the commander of the Excubitors (comes excubitorum).

Anastasius died childless in Constantinople on 9 July 518. He was 90 and a half years old according to the later chronicles of John Malalas (c. 491–578) and the Chronicon Paschale (c. 630). The early 6th-century historian Victor of Tunnuna states that he died at the age of 88, a figure accepted by most modern historians.

He became the last emperor known to be consecrated as divus on his death. Anastasius left the Imperial treasury with 23,000,000 solidi, which is 320,000 pounds of gold or 420 long tons (430 t). Justin then became the next emperor.

== Legacy ==
A 40-nummi coin of Anastasius is depicted on the obverse of North Macedonia's 50 denar banknote, issued in 1996.

== See also ==
- List of Byzantine emperors
- Pompey – claimed by Anastasius as his ancestor
- Syriac literature – experienced a period of growth during Anastasius's reign

== Sources ==
- Arce, Ignacio; Feissel, Denis (2014). The Edict of Emperor Anastasius I (491–518 AD): An Interim Report. Amman: DAAD. OCLC 889751713.
- Brown, Peter (1989). The World of Late Antiquity: AD 150–750. New York and London: W.W. Norton and Co. ISBN 978-0-39395-803-4.
- Charanis, Peter (1935). The religious policy of Anastasius I: emperor of the later Roman Empire 491–518. Madison Wis.: University of Wisconsin—Madison. OCLC 827230820.
- Durant, Will (1950). The Age of Faith. The Story of Civilization. Vol. IV. New York: Simon and Schuster. OCLC 225699907.
- Greatrex, Geoffrey; Lieu, Samuel N. C. (29 June 2005). The Roman Eastern Frontier and the Persian Wars AD 363–628. London: Routledge. ISBN 978-0-415-14687-6.
- Hussey, J.M., ed. (1985). The Cambridge Medieval History. CUP Archive. ISBN 978-0-521-04535-3.
- Haarer, Fiona (2006). Anastasius I: Politics and Empire in the Late Roman World. Francis Cairns.
- Kaldellis, Anthony (2023). The New Roman Empire: A History of Byzantium. New York: Oxford University Press. ISBN 978-0197549322.
- Martindale, John R., ed. (1980). The Prosopography of the Later Roman Empire: Volume II, AD 395–527. Cambridge: Cambridge University Press. ISBN 0-521-20159-4.
- Meyendorff, John (1989). Imperial unity and Christian divisions: The Church 450–680 A.D. The Church in history. Vol. 2. Crestwood, NY: St. Vladimir's Seminary Press. ISBN 978-0-88-141056-3.
- Norwich, John (1988). Byzantium: the Early Centuries. London: Penguin. ISBN 978-0-670-80251-7.
- Ostrogorsky, George (1957). History of The Byzantine State. New Brunswick: Rutgers University Press. OCLC 422217218.
- Pazdernik, Charles (1999). "Anicia Juliana". In G.W. Bowersock; Peter Brown; Oleg Grabar (eds.). Late Antiquity: A Guide to the Postclassical World. Cambridge, MA: The Belknap Press of Harvard University Press. ISBN 978-0-67451-173-6.
- Settipani, Christian (1989). Les ancêtres de Charlemagne (in French).
- Settipani, Christian (2000). Continuité gentilice et continuité sénatoriale dans les familles sénatoriales romaines à l'époque impériale (in French).
- Settipani, Christian (2006). Continuité des élites à Byzance durant les siècles obscurs. Les princes caucasiens et l'Empire du VIe au IXe siècle Continuité des élites à Byzance durant les siècles obscurs (in French).
- Rösch, Gerhard (1978). Onoma Basileias: Studien zum offiziellen Gebrauch der Kaisertitel in spätantiker und frühbyzantinischer Zeit. Byzantina et Neograeca Vindobonensia (in German). Verlag der österreichischen Akademie der Wissenschaften. ISBN 978-3-7001-0260-1.
- Wijnendaele, Jeroen W.P. (2024). De wereld van Clovis, de val van Rome en de geboorte van het westen [The World of Clovis, the Fall of Rome and the Birth of the West] (in Dutch). Ertsberg. ISBN 9789464984064.
- Zacharias of Mytilene, Syriac Chronicle, Book VII, Chapter VI

Anastasius I Dicorus Leonid dynasty Born: c. 431 Died: 9 July 518
Regnal titles
Preceded by Zeno	Byzantine emperor 491–518	Succeeded by Justin I
Political offices
Preceded by Anicius Olybrius junior	Roman consul 492 with Rufus	Succeeded by Caecina Decius Faustus Albinus, Eusebius II
Preceded by Paulus, Post consulatum Viatoris (West)	Roman consul II; 497	Succeeded by Paulinus, John the Scythian
Preceded by Ennodius Messala, Areobindus Dagalaifus Areobindus	Roman consul III; 507 with Venantius and Clovis I	Succeeded by Decius Basilius Venantius, Celer
