= Tribute Money =

Tribute Money may refer to:

- The Tribute Money (Champaigne), a c. 1663–1665 painting by Philippe de Champaigne
- The Tribute Money (Jordaens), a painting by Jacob Jordaens
- The Tribute Money (Masaccio), a fresco in the Brancacci Chapel
- The Tribute Money (Rubens), a 1612–1614 painting by Peter Paul Rubens
- The Tribute Money (Titian), a 1516 painting by Titian
- The Tribute Money (Copley), a 1782 painting by John Singleton Copley
- The Tribute Money, either of two paintings by Giuseppe Bazzani
- The Tribute Money, an 1817 painting by George Hayter
- The Tribute Money, a painting by Ludovico Mazzolino
- The Tribute Money, a 1629 etching by Rembrandt
- The Tribute Money, a painting by Alexander Maximilian Seitz
- The Tribute Money, a painting by Giovanni Serodine

== See also ==
- Christ and the Tribute Money, a painting by Anton von Werner
- Saint Peter Finding the Tribute Money, a 1617–1618 painting by Peter Paul Rubens
- Tribute (disambiguation)
- Tribute penny
