= Coins in the Bible =

A number of coins are mentioned in the Bible, and they have proved very popular among coin collectors.

Specific coins mentioned in the Bible include the widow's mite, the tribute penny and the thirty pieces of silver, though it is not always possible to identify the exact coin that was used.

== Widow's mite ==
The coin referred to in the lesson of the widow's mite was a lepton, the smallest and least valuable coin in circulation in Judea.

== Tribute penny ==
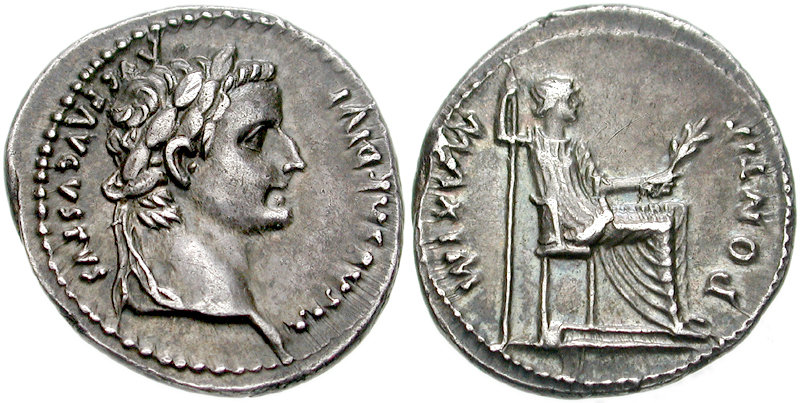
A denarius of Tiberius

The tribute penny was the coin that was shown to Jesus when he made his famous speech "Render unto Caesar..." It is usually thought that the coin was a Roman denarius with the head of Tiberius. However, it has been suggested that the coin may have instead been an Antiochan tetradrachm bearing the head of Tiberius, with Augustus on the reverse or the denarius of Augustus with Caius and Lucius on the reverse. Coins of Julius Caesar, Mark Antony and Germanicus are also considered possibilities.

== Coin in the fish's mouth ==
The coin in the fish's mouth mentioned in Matthew 17 is usually thought to be a Tyrian shekel.

== Thirty pieces of silver ==
According to the Gospel of Matthew 26:15, the price for which Judas Iscariot betrayed Jesus was thirty pieces of silver. Scholars disagree on the identity of the coins involved. Donald Wiseman suggests two possibilities for the identity of the coins used to pay Judas. They may have been tetradrachms of Tyre, usually referred to as Tyrian shekels (about 1.38 troy ounces), or they may have been staters from Antioch, which bore the head of Augustus. Alternatively, they may have been Ptolemaic tetradrachms.

== See also ==
- Shekel
