= 494 (disambiguation) =

494 may refer to:

- Interstate 494
- 494 Commuter Services
- Minuscule 494

== See also ==
- 494th (disambiguation)
- Events in 494
