= Oxford Dictionary of Byzantium =

Dictionary of the Byzantine Empire

- Three-volume set
- Author: Alexander Kazhdan (ed.)
- Language: English
- Subject: Byzantine Empire
- Genre: Reference work
- Publisher: Oxford University Press
- Publication date: 1991
- Pages: 2,366
- ISBN: 0195046528
- OCLC: 22733550

The Oxford Dictionary of Byzantium (ODB) is a three-volume historical dictionary published by the English Oxford University Press. With more than 5,000 entries, it contains comprehensive information in English on topics relating to the Byzantine Empire. It was edited by Alexander Kazhdan, and was first published in 1991. Kazhdan was a professor at Princeton University who became a Senior Research Associate at Dumbarton Oaks, Washington, DC, before his death. He contributed to many of the articles in the Dictionary and always signed his initials A.K. at the end of the article to indicate his contribution.

== Description ==
The dictionary is available in printed and e-reference text versions from Oxford Reference Online. It covers the main historical events of Byzantium, as well as important social and religious events. It also includes biographies of eminent political and literary personalities and describes in detail religious, social, cultural, legal and political topics. Cultural topics include music, theology and the arts. Other topics covered include warfare, demography, education, agriculture, commerce, science, philosophy, and medicine, providing a comprehensive picture of the complex and advanced political and social structures of Byzantine society.
