= 494th =

494th may refer to:

- 494th Bombardment Squadron, inactive United States Air Force unit
- 494th Bombardment Wing, inactive United States Air Force unit
- 494th Fighter Squadron (494 FS), part of the 48th Fighter Wing at RAF Lakenheath, England

== See also ==
- 494 (number)
- 494 (disambiguation)
- 494, the year 494 (CDXCIV) of the Julian calendar
- 494 BC
