= Commissum divinitus =

1835 papal encyclical by Gregory XVI

Commissum divinitus Latin for 'Divinely commissioned' Encyclical of Pope Gregory XVI
- Signature date: 14 May 1835
- Subject: Church and state
- Number: 6 of 9 of the pontificate
- Text: In English

Commissum divinitus was an encyclical letter issued by Pope Gregory XVI on 14 May 1835, addressed to the Swiss clergy.

== Purpose ==
Gregory issued the encyclical in response to the Articles of Baden of 1834, calling them "false, rash, erroneous, prejudicial to the Holy See, destructive to the government of the Church and its divine constitution, and subjecting ecclesiastical ministry [of the] Church to secular domination". In particular, the encyclical criticizes the Swiss government for legalizing marriage between Catholics and non-Catholics, rejecting the suggestion that the secular government held the authority to regulate marriage.

Gregory refers to two historical texts in the letter where distinctions between ecclesiastical and civic authority had been maintained and the primacy of the former enforced:

- Bishop Ossius of Cordoba's letter to Emperor Constantius II regarding imperial interference in church matters (353)
- Pope Gelasius I's letter to Emperor Anastasius, Famuli vestrae pietatis, on the allocation of power within the spiritual and temporal realms (494).

The encyclical maintained Gregory's opposition to political liberalism. Gregory rejects the authority of secular governments to regulate the Catholic church, and opposes the idea of national churches. This position, as laid out in Commissum divinitus, led seven Catholic cantons of Switzerland to form the Sonderbund.
