= Hunter Collection =

Art collection owned by John Hunter

The Art Collection of John Hunter was a collection of old master and contemporary paintings amassed by John Hunter, an auctioneer and politician, and held by the Hunter family until the death of his only son, Elias Desbrosses Hunter, in 1865. It was auctioned off by the family in January 1866.

== History ==
John Hunter was a Columbia graduate who had taken over his father's auction and commission business at Pearl and Wall Streets in Manhattan. Although Hunter began assembling his collection as early as 1800, it wasn't until he sold the family business in 1810 that his monumental collecting began in earnest. Most of the collection was obtained before 1835 through his agent, Mr. Hobson, and reportedly contained a number of pieces by "Domenichino, Guido Reni, Guercino, Carlo Maratti, Peter Paul Rubens, Anthony van Dyck, Rembrandt, and others."

=== 1866 auction ===
Following the death of his only son in 1866, his grandson, John Hunter III, decided to sell the family estate, Hunter's Island to former Mayor Ambrose Kingsland $127,501, and auction the collection. The auction by Henry H. Leeds & Miner at their "Dusseldorf Galleries" at 548 Broadway (next door to Tiffany & Co.) consisted of 373 "ancient and modern oil paintings" including a number by masters. At the time of its sale, the "collection was billed as the largest and finest such collection ever exhibited or offered for sale in the United States."

On the first evening there were sold 123 pictures, which yielded $3,433. The second evening there were also brought under the hammer 123 paintings, which went for an aggregate of $6,895, or a total of 246 pictures sold, and $10,328 realized on Wednesday and Thursday nights. On Friday evening there remained to be disposed of 127 pictures... The entire amount of sales last night footed up $18,916.50, making a grand total of all realized for the entire collection of $29,244.50. The highest price paid was for a piece entitled, "The Swing," by Anthony Watteau, which brought $1,250.

At the time, all were considered authentic, but it was later discovered that Hunter's Raphael Madonna and Child with John the Baptist (titled as Madonna and Infant Savior in the catalogue) (Note: The catalogue says "This picture was considered by Mr. Hunter as the most valuable in his collection. It was purchased in Paris during the three days revolution, and was taken from the palace of Charles X. No doubt has existed to its originality, and it is probably the only picture by the great master in this country.") was actually the work of either Giambettino Cignaroli or his half brother, Giuseppe Cignaroli. It was sold to Hunter as authentic and, thereafter, sold to Bostonian Peter Chardon Brooks. Today, and hangs in the McMullen Museum of Art at Boston College. (Note: In the twentieth century, after its attribution to Raphael was deemed untenable, the Brooks family donated it to a local priest, who likely gifted it to Boston College.)

=== Notable works ===
- Sacking a Village by Philips Wouwerman
- A copy of a Frans van Mieris painting
- Purchasing Fruit by Anonymous
- Pet Bird by François Boucher
- The Tribute Money by John Singleton Copley
- Murder of the Innocents by Peter Paul Rubens
- Singing Party by unknown
- Alexander the Great Elevating Abdalomyne, the gardener, to the Kingdom of Sidon by Jean-Honoré Fragonard
- Alexander the Great after his return from Egypt, visiting the Temple of Jupiter Ammon by Jean-Honoré Fragonard
- Hunting the Boar by Frans Snyders
- Christ in the house of the Pharisee, the woman anointing the feet of the Savior by Paolo Veronese
- Joseph Interpreting the Dreams by Franz Ignaz Oefele
- Monkeys by David Teniers the Younger
- The Music Party by Jan Josef Horemans the Younger
- Ascension of the Virgin by Pietro Berrettini
- Market Scene by Giacomo Da Ponte
- A landscape by Aelbert Cuyp
- Grecian Daughter by Anthoni Schoonjans
- Dead Game, Lobster and Fruit by Jan Weenix
- A Stable Yard by George Morland
- Fox, Dog and Dead Fowl by Paul de Vos

== Collection ==
=== Paintings ===
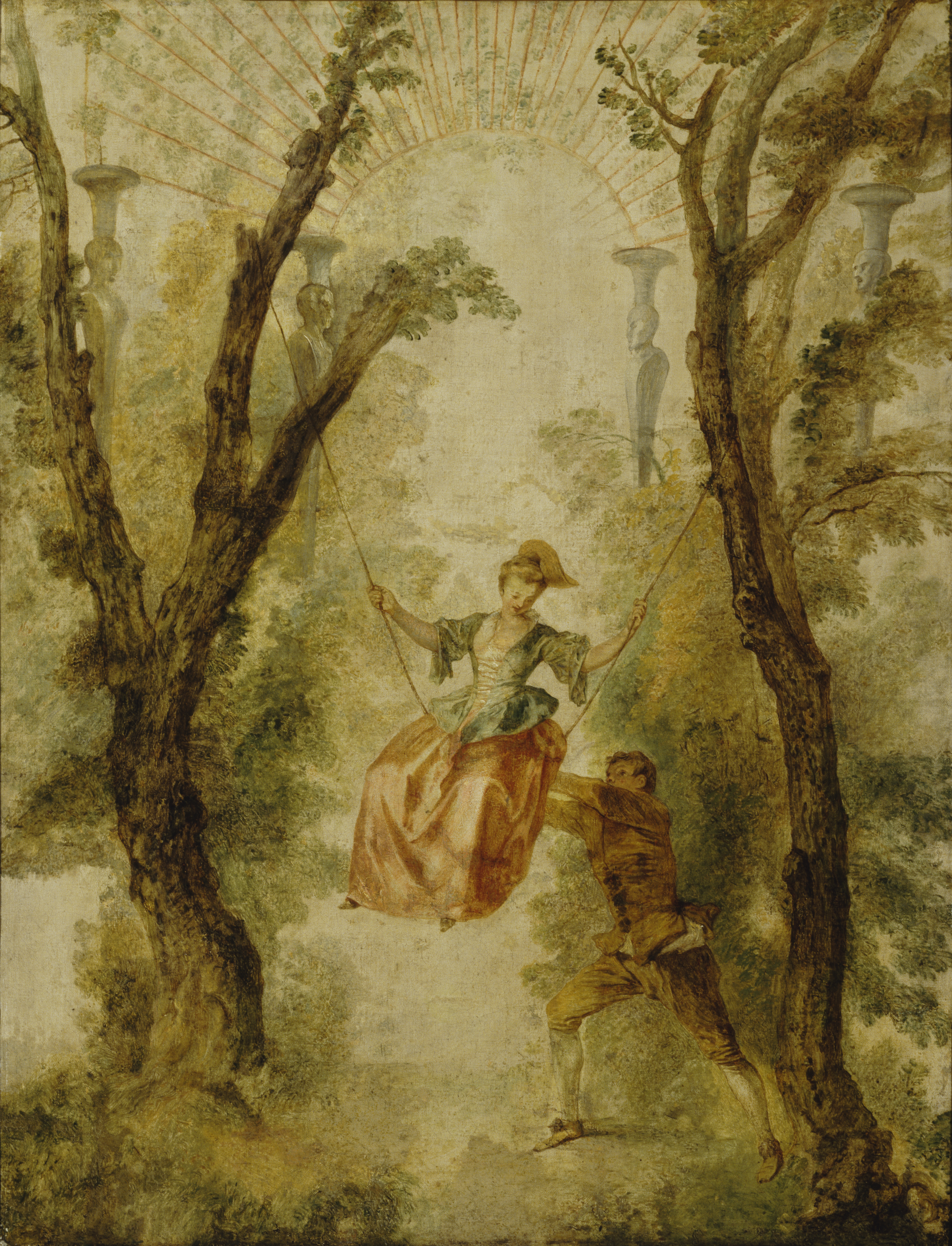
The Swing by Antoine Watteau (c. 1712)

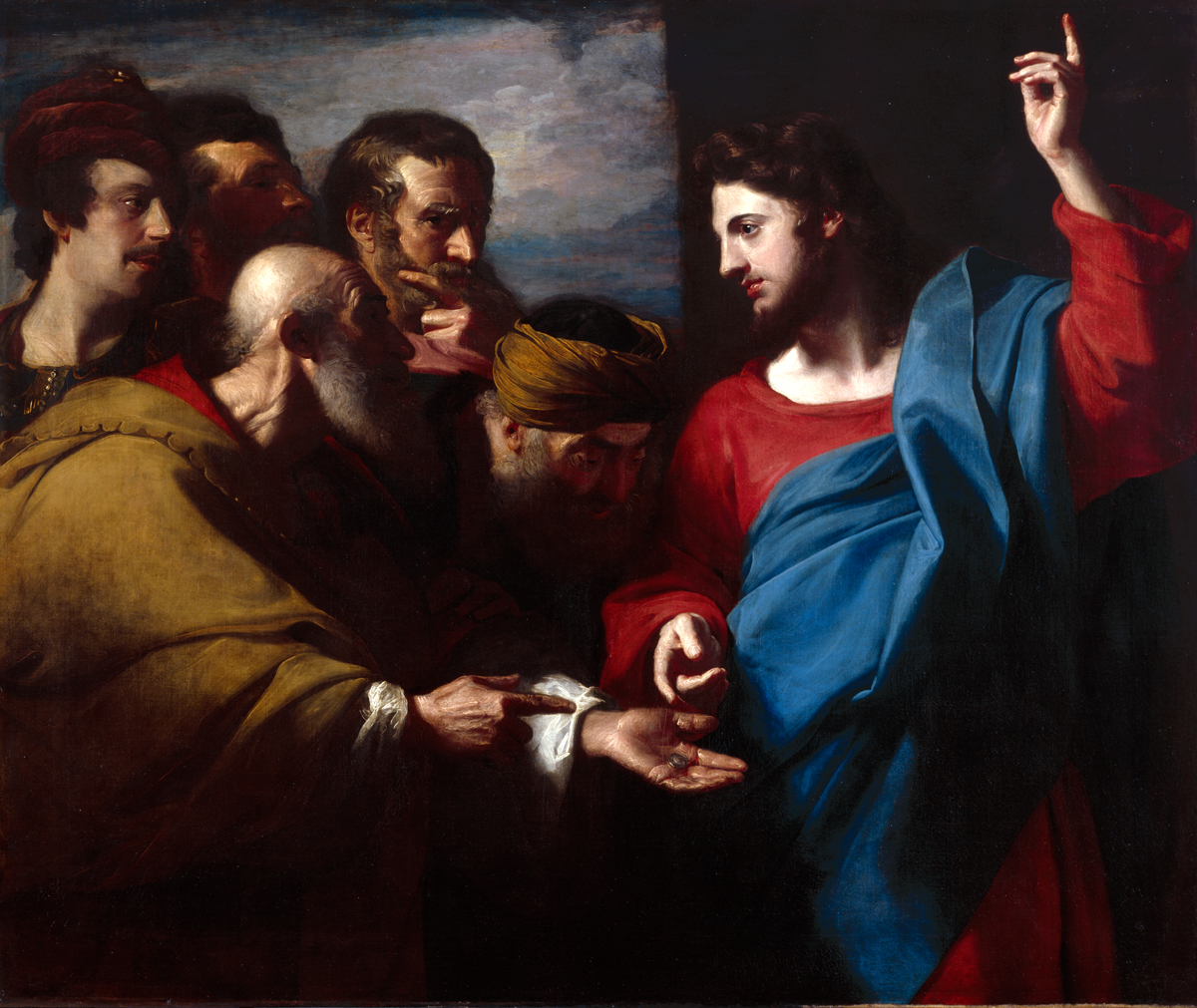
The Tribute Money by John Singleton Copley (1782)
