= The Tribute Money (Champaigne) =

Painting by Philippe de Champaigne

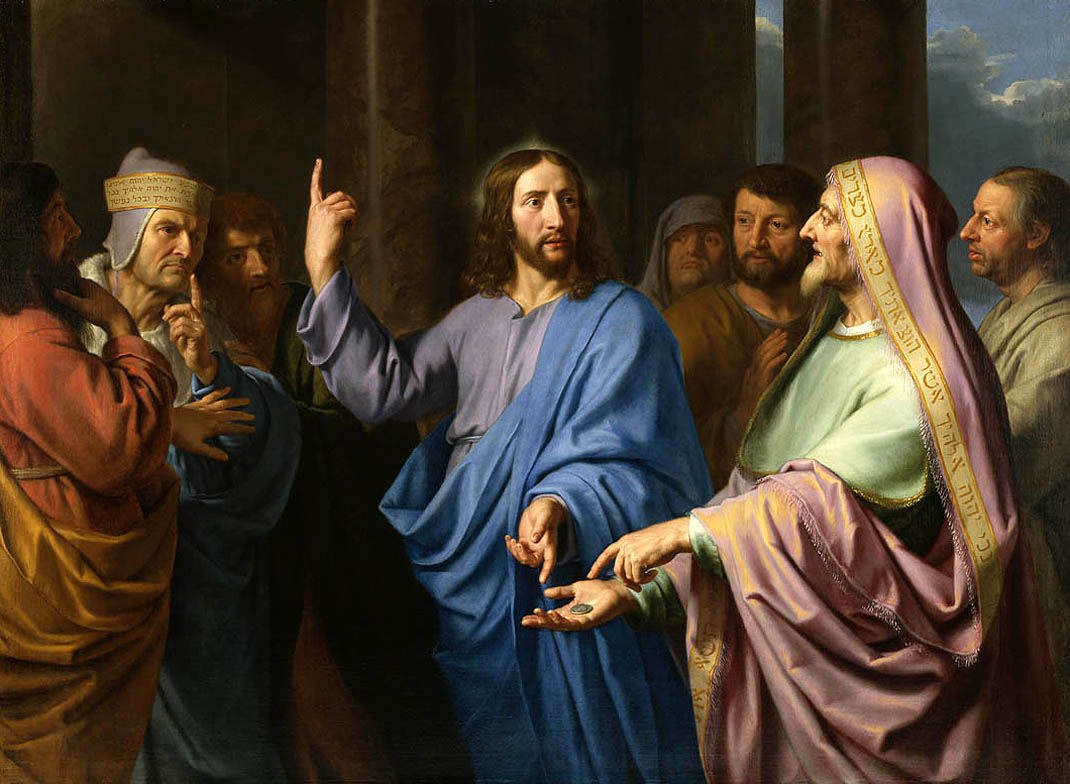
- Artist: Philippe de Champaigne
- Year: c. 1663-1665
- Medium: oil on canvas
- Dimensions: 138.5 cm × 188 cm (54.5 in × 74 in)
- Location: Montreal Museum of Fine Arts; Montreal

The Tribute Money is an oil on canvas painting by the Flemish-French painter Philippe de Champaigne, created c. 1663–1665. It is held at the Montreal Museum of Fine Arts.

== History and description ==
Known for his religious works, Philippe de Champaigne illustrates here the famous episode from the Gospels, when the Pharisees asked Jesus Christ if it was correct to pay tribute to the Romans, by presenting him a denarius. A negative response could have caused reprisals from the Romans. It was at this moment that Jesus replied: “Render unto Caesar the things that are Caesar’s and unto God the things that are God’s.”

In a format where the life-size painted characters seem to encourage the viewer to participate in the scene, Champaigne depicts Jesus while he points to the denarius, stamped with the effigy of Caesar, held by the Pharisee, and, with his finger pointed to the air to indicate God, gives his answer. In a classic and rigorous style, Philippe de Champaigne balances bright colors, including the Pharisee's shawl hemmed with an inscription in Hebrew. On the left, another Pharisee wearing a headband also covered with Hebrew inscriptions seems to be thinking about Jesus' response, as does the one on the far left, with one hand on his chin. On the left side, a character seen in profile would be a self-portrait of the artist.

The painting shows the influence of Raphael and Nicolas Poussin, specially in the composition.
