= 473 =

473 in various calendars
- Gregorian calendar: 473; CDLXXIII
- Ab urbe condita: 1226
- Assyrian calendar: 5223
- Balinese saka calendar: 394–395
- Bengali calendar: −121 – −120
- Berber calendar: 1423
- Buddhist calendar: 1017
- Burmese calendar: −165
- Byzantine calendar: 5981–5982
- Chinese calendar: 壬子年 (Water Rat); 3170 or 2963 — to — 癸丑年 (Water Ox); 3171 or 2964
- Coptic calendar: 189–190
- Discordian calendar: 1639
- Ethiopian calendar: 465–466
- Hebrew calendar: 4233–4234
- Hindu calendars
- Vikram Samvat: 529–530
- Shaka Samvat: 394–395
- Kali Yuga: 3573–3574
- Holocene calendar: 10473
- Iranian calendar: 149 BP – 148 BP
- Islamic calendar: 154 BH – 153 BH
- Javanese calendar: 358–359
- Julian calendar: 473; CDLXXIII
- Korean calendar: 2806
- Minguo calendar: 1439 before ROC 民前1439年
- Nanakshahi calendar: −995
- Seleucid era: 784/785 AG
- Thai solar calendar: 1015–1016
- Tibetan calendar: ཆུ་ཕོ་བྱི་བ་ལོ་ (male Water-Rat); 599 or 218 or −554 — to — ཆུ་མོ་གླང་ལོ་ (female Water-Ox); 600 or 219 or −553

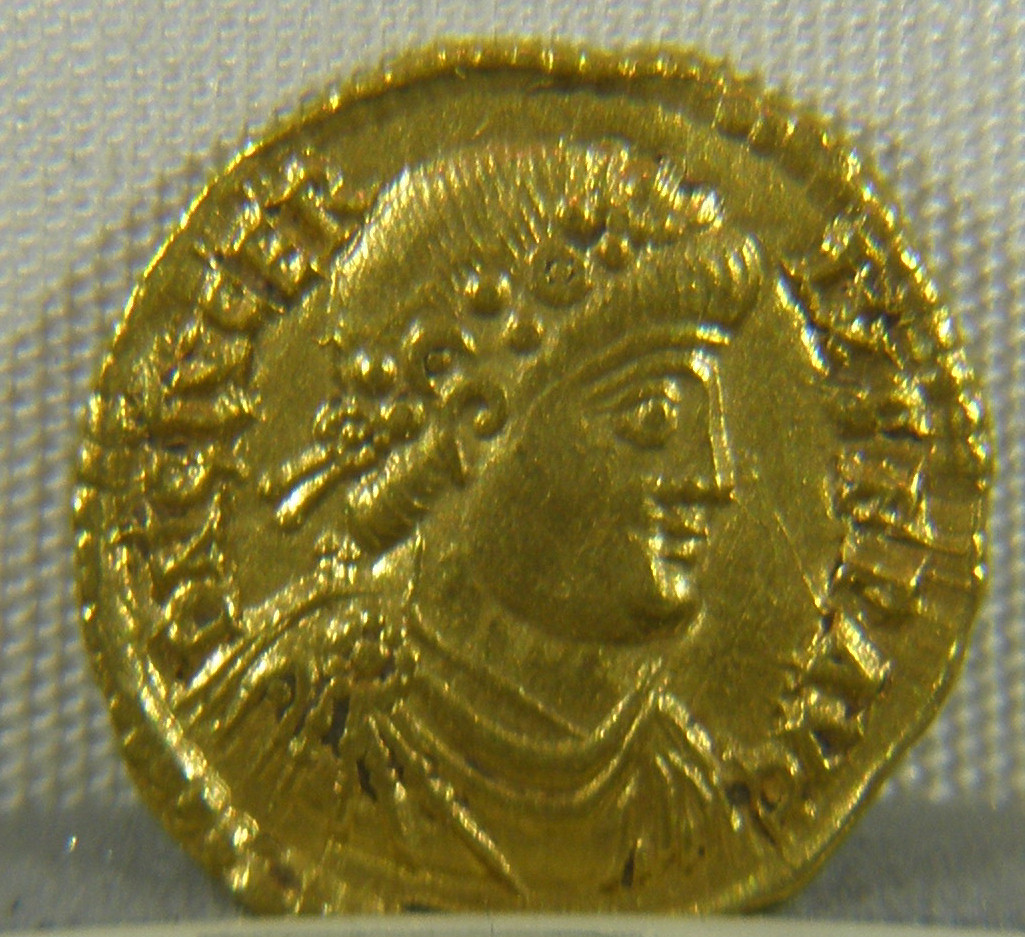
Solidus of Emperor Glycerius

Year 473 (CDLXXIII) was a common year starting on Monday of the Julian calendar. At the time, it was known as the Year of the Consulship of Leo without colleague (or, less frequently, year 1226 Ab urbe condita). The denomination 473 for this year has been used since the early medieval period, when the Anno Domini calendar era became the prevalent method in Europe for naming years.

== Events ==
=== By place ===
==== Roman Empire ====
- March 3 – Gundobad (nephew of Ricimer) nominates Glycerius as emperor of the Western Roman Empire. Emperor Leo I refuses to recognize him, and chooses Julius Nepos as candidate to the Western throne.
- October 25 – Leo I grants his grandson Leo II, age 6, the title of Caesar (approximate date).

==== Balkans ====
- Theodoric Strabo signs a peace treaty with Leo I, and according to the terms the Goths are paid with an annual tribute of 2,000 pounds of gold. Leo gives him an independent state in Thrace and he obtains the rank of magister militum.
- The Ostrogoths leave Pannonia, and migrate to Macedonia and Moesia, from whence they ravage the Balkans.

==== Europe ====
- King Euric orders the invasion of Italy, but is defeated by Glycerius. The Visigoths withdraw to Gaul, and conquer the cities of Arles and Marseille.
- Gundobad returns to Burgundy, where his father Gondioc has died, and becomes king of the Burgundians.

== Births ==
- Xiao Zhaoye, Chinese emperor of Southern Qi (known as the Prince of Yulin) (d. 494)
- Kavad I, king (shah) of the Sasanian Empire from 488 to 531, with an interruption of two years

== Deaths ==
- Euthymius the Great, abbot and bishop (b. 377)
- Gondioc, king of Burgundy (approximate date)
