= 494 =

Calendar year

494 in various calendars
Gregorian calendar	494; CDXCIV
Ab urbe condita	1247
Assyrian calendar	5244
Balinese saka calendar	415–416
Bengali calendar	−100 – −99
Berber calendar	1444
Buddhist calendar	1038
Burmese calendar	−144
Byzantine calendar	6002–6003
Chinese calendar	癸酉年 (Water Rooster); 3191 or 2984 — to — 甲戌年 (Wood Dog); 3192 or 2985
Coptic calendar	210–211
Discordian calendar	1660
Ethiopian calendar	486–487
Hebrew calendar	4254–4255
- Hindu calendars
Vikram Samvat	550–551
Shaka Samvat	415–416
Kali Yuga	3594–3595
Holocene calendar	10494
Iranian calendar	128 BP – 127 BP
Islamic calendar	132 BH – 131 BH
Javanese calendar	380–381
Julian calendar	494; CDXCIV
Korean calendar	2827
Minguo calendar	1418 before ROC 民前1418年
Nanakshahi calendar	−974
Seleucid era	805/806 AG
Thai solar calendar	1036–1037
Tibetan calendar	ཆུ་མོ་བྱ་ལོ་ (female Water-Bird); 620 or 239 or −533 — to — ཤིང་ཕོ་ཁྱི་ལོ་ (male Wood-Dog); 621 or 240 or −532

Year 494 (CDXCIV) was a common year starting on Saturday of the Julian calendar. At the time, it was known as the Year of the Consulship of Rufius and Praesidius (or, less frequently, year 1247 Ab urbe condita). The denomination 494 for this year has been used since the early medieval period, when the Anno Domini calendar era became the prevalent method in Europe for naming years.

== Events ==
=== By place ===
==== Byzantine Empire ====
- An earthquake devastates the port town of Latakia (modern Syria).

==== China ====
- Emperor Xiao Wen Di moves the capital of Northern Wei from Datong to Luoyang. He makes Chinese the official language of his court, and orders his nobility to adopt Chinese names.

=== By topic ===
==== Religion ====
- Gelasius I delineates the relationship between church and state (Doctrine of the two swords, formulated in his letter Famuli vestrae pietatis to the East Roman Emperor Anastasius I.)
- The Decretum Gelasianum is attributed.
- Gelasius I canonizes Saint George.

== Births ==
- Gildas, British historian and priest (approximate date)

== Deaths ==
- Xiao Zhaowen, emperor of Southern Qi (b. 480)
- Xiao Zhaoye, emperor of Southern Qi (known as the Prince of Yulin) (b. 473)
