= Famuli vestrae pietatis =

494 CE letter by Gelasius I of Rome

Famuli vestrae pietatis Latin for 'Servants of your piety' Letter of Pope Gelasius I
- Signature date: 494
- Subject: Relations between the Catholic Church and the state

Famuli vestrae pietatis, also known by the Latin mnemonic duo sunt ('there are two'), is a letter written in 494 by Pope Gelasius I to Byzantine Emperor Anastasius I Dicorus on the relationship between religious and secular officials.

== Description ==
Famuli vestrae pietatis is a letter written in 494 by Pope Gelasius I to Byzantine Emperor Anastasius I Dicorus which expressed the Gelasian doctrine. According to commentary in the Enchiridion symbolorum, the letter is "the most celebrated document of the ancient Church concerning the two powers on earth." The Gelasian doctrine articulates a Christian theology about division of authority and power. All medieval theories about division of power between priestly spiritual authority and secular temporal authority were versions of the Gelasian doctrine.

According to the Gelasian doctrine, secular temporal authority is inferior to priestly spiritual authority since a priestly spiritual authority is responsible for the eternal condition of both a secular temporal authority and the subjects of that secular temporal authority but "implies that the priestly authority is inferior to the secular authority in the secular domain."

== Dualistic principle of Church and State ==
This letter established the dualistic principle that would underlie all Western European political thought for almost a millennium. Gelasius expressed a distinction between two principles governing the world, which Gelasius called the "sacred authority of bishops" (auctoritas sacrata pontificum) and the "royal power" (regalis potestas).

== Potestas and auctoritas ==
These two principles—auctoritas lending justification to potestas, and potestas providing the executive strength for auctoritas—were, Gelasius said, to be considered independent in their own spheres of operation, yet expected to work together in harmony.

== See also ==
- Hugh of Saint Victor (c. 1135) On the Sacraments of the Christian Faith.
- Pope Boniface VIII (1302) Unam sanctam, about two allegorical swords.
- Render unto Caesar
- Romans 13
- Doctrine of the two swords

== Bibliography ==
- Bjork, Robert E., ed. (2010). "Gelasian doctrine". The Oxford Dictionary of the Middle Ages. Oxford University Press. ISBN 9780199574834 – via Oxford Reference. (subscription required)
- Denzinger, Heinrich; Hünermann, Peter; et al., eds. (2012). "Compendium of Creeds, Definitions, and Declarations on Matters of Faith and Morals". Enchiridion symbolorum: a compendium of creeds, definitions and declarations of the Catholic Church (43rd ed.). San Francisco: Ignatius Press. ISBN 978-0898707465.
- This article incorporates text from this source, which is in the public domain: Gelasius I (1904) [Composed in 494]. "Letter of Pope Gelasius to Emperor Anastasius on the superiority of the spiritual over temporal power". In Robinson, James H. (ed.). Readings in European History. Vol. 1. Boston [u.a.]: Ginn. pp. 72–73. OCLC 571244926 – via Internet Medieval Sourcebook.
- Kuehn, Evan F. (2010). "Melchizadek as exemplar for kingship in twelfth-century political thought". History of Political Thought. 31 (4). Exeter, UK: Imprint Academic: 557–575. ISSN 0143-781X.
- Strawn, Brent A., ed. (2015). "Medieval Period". The Oxford Encyclopedia of the Bible and Law. Oxford University Press. ISBN 9780199843312 – via Oxford Reference. (subscription required)
