= The Tribute Money (Rubens) =

Painting by Peter Paul Rubens

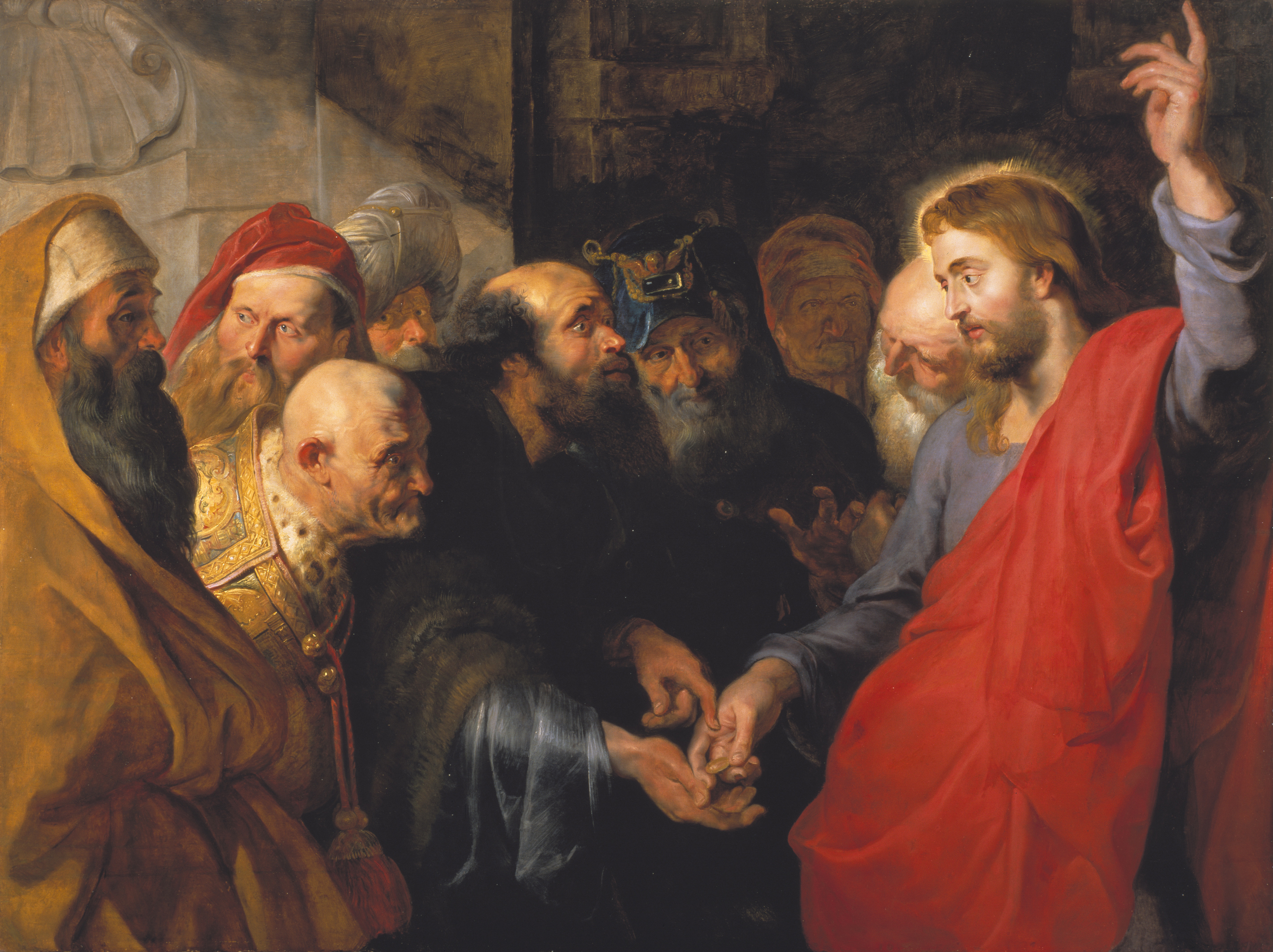
- Artist: Peter Paul Rubens
- Year: c. 1610-1615
- Medium: Oil on wood panel
- Dimensions: 144.1 cm × 189.1 cm (56.7 in × 74.4 in)
- Location: The Legion of Honor (Gallery 014), Fine Arts Museums of San Francisco, San Francisco, California
- Accession: 44.11
- Website: Page in FAMSF's Online Collections

The Tribute Money is a 1610–1615 painting by Peter Paul Rubens(1577–1640), which has been in the Legion of Honor at the Fine Arts Museums of San Francisco since 1944. It illustrates the Biblical account of Christ's reply to the question posed by the Pharisees on Roman taxes.
