= Pope Gelasius I =

Head of the Catholic Church from 492 to 496

Pope Saint Gelasius I
- Bishop of Rome
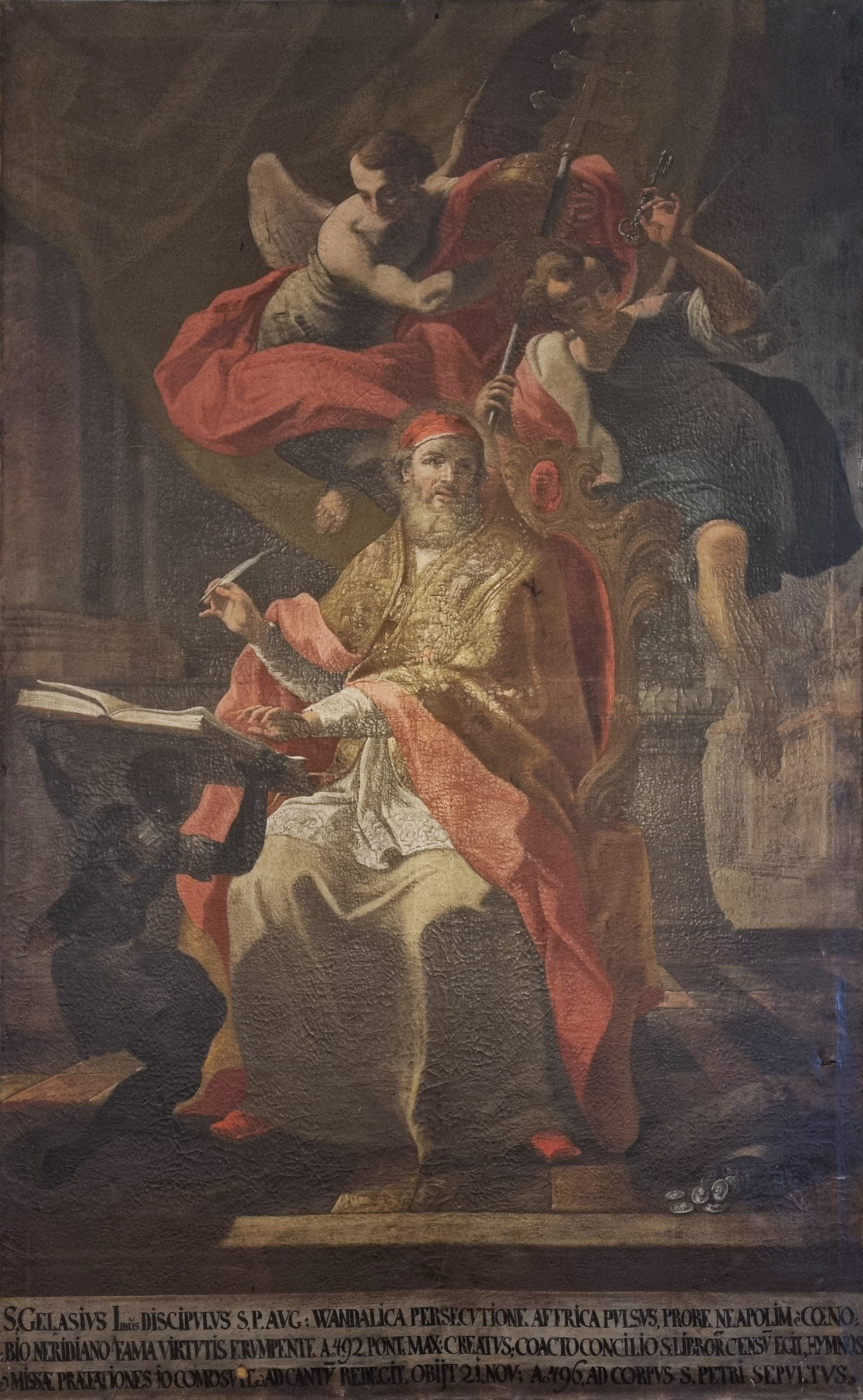
- A portrait of Gelasius I in St Thomas's Abbey, Brno, made c. 1760
- Church: Catholic Church
- Papacy began: 1 March 492
- Papacy ended: 19 November 496
- Predecessor: Felix III
- Successor: Anastasius II

Personal details
- Born: Africa or Rome, Italy, Western Roman Empire
- Died: 19 November 496 Rome, Ostrogothic Kingdom

Sainthood
- Feast day: 21 November

Pope Gelasius I was the bishop of Rome from 1 March 492 to his death on 19 November 496. Gelasius was a prolific author whose style placed him on the cusp between Late Antiquity and the Early Middle Ages. Some scholars have argued that his predecessor Felix III may have employed him to draft papal documents, although this is not certain.

During his pontificate he called for strict Catholic orthodoxy, more assertively demanded obedience to papal authority, and, consequently, increased the tension between the Western and Eastern Churches. Surprisingly, he also had cordial relations with the Ostrogoths, who were Arians (i.e., had a different view on the nature of Jesus), and therefore perceived as heretics from the perspective of Nicene Christians.

== Place of birth ==
Known as the third African Pope, there is some confusion regarding where Gelasius was born: according to the Liber Pontificalis he was born in the Roman province of Africa (present-day Tunisia), referred to as "natione Afer", while in a letter addressed to the Roman Emperor Anastasius he stated that he was "born a Roman" ("Romanus natus"). J. Conant opined that the latter assertion probably merely denotes that he was born in Roman Africa before the Vandals invaded it.

== Acacian schism ==
The papal election of Gelasius on 1 March 492 was a gesture of continuity: Gelasius inherited the conflicts of Pope Felix III with Eastern Roman Emperor Anastasius and the patriarch of Constantinople and exacerbated them by insisting on the obliteration of the name of the deceased Patriarch Acacius of Constantinople from the diptychs, in spite of every ecumenical gesture offered by the contemporaneous Patriarch Euphemius.

The split with the Emperor and the Patriarch of Constantinople was inevitable, from the Western view, because they considered the Monophysite view of Jesus Christ having only a Divine nature a heresy. Gelasius authored the book De duabus in Christo naturis (On the dual nature of Christ), which described Catholic doctrine in the matter. Thus Gelasius, for all the conservative Latinity of his style of writing, was on the cusp of Late Antiquity and the Early Middle Ages.

During the Acacian schism, Gelasius advocated the primacy of the See of Rome over the universal Church, both East and West, and he presented this doctrine in terms that became the model for successive popes, who also claimed papal supremacy because of their succession to the papacy from the first supreme pontiff, Peter the Apostle.

In 494, Gelasius authored the very influential letter Duo sunt to Anastasius on the subject of the relation of Church and state, which letter had political impact for more than a millennium: Pope Gregory XVI quoted from it in his letter to the Swiss clergy, Commissum divinitus (17 May 1835), responding to the Baden articles, which gave some of the Swiss cantons authority over church matters including the sacraments.

== Suppression of the Lupercalia ==
Closer to home, after a long contest Gelasius finally suppressed the ancient Roman festival of the Lupercalia, which had persisted for several generations among a nominally Christian population. Gelasius' letter to the senator Andromachus treated the primary contentions of the controversy and incidentally provided some details of the festival, which combined fertility and purification, that might have been lost otherwise.

Although the Lupercalia was a festival of purification, which had given its name "dies februatus", from "februare" ("to purify"), to the month of February, it was unrelated to the Feast of the Purification of the Blessed Virgin Mary, also commonly denominated "Candlemas", which latter feast commemorates the fulfillment of the Holy Family's ceremonial obligations pursuant to Mosaic law 40 days after the birth of the first son. In the instance of the Holy Family, that occurred 40 days after Christmas, on 2 February.

== Death ==
After a brief yet dynamic ministry, Gelasius died on 19 November 496. His feast day is 21 November because he was buried that day.

== Works ==
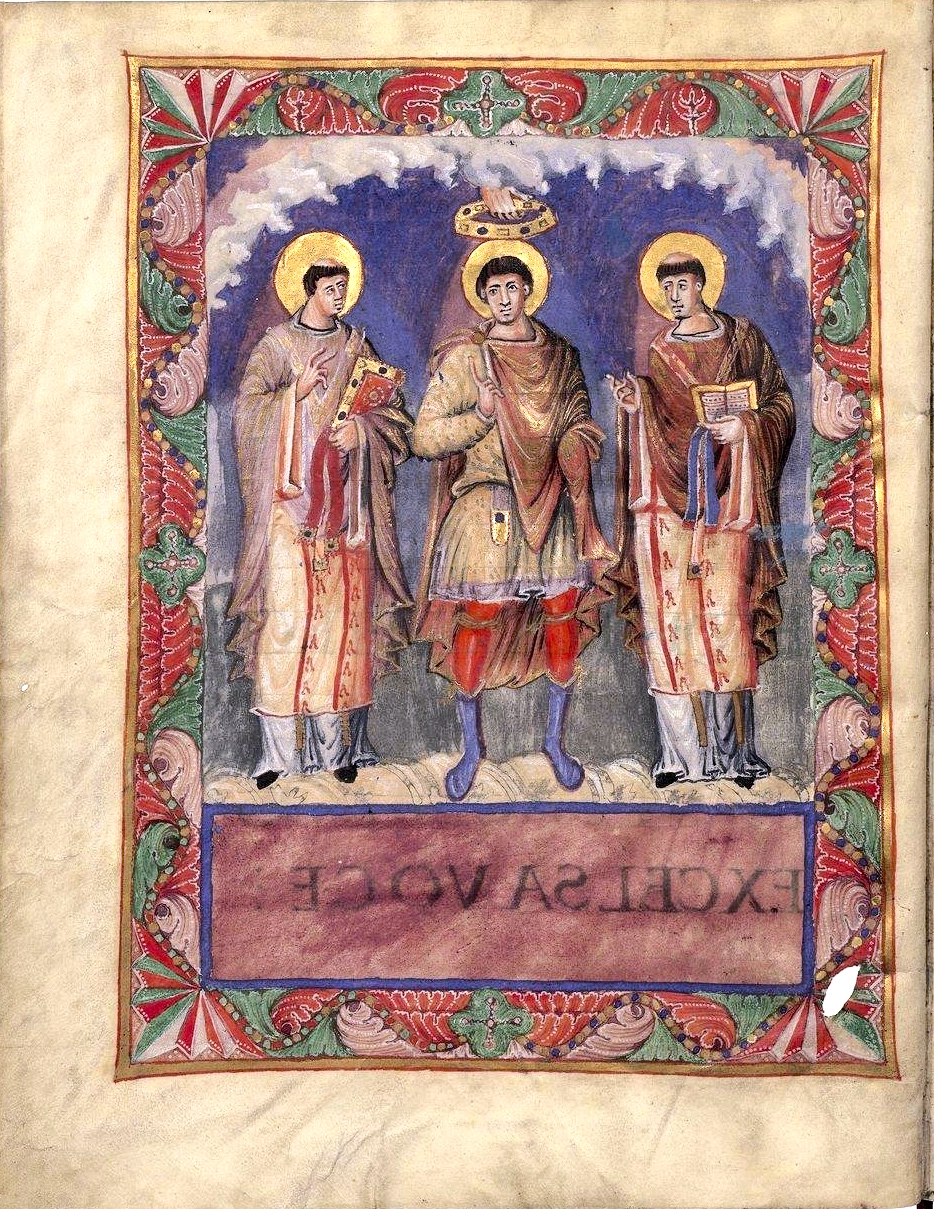
A circa 870 image featuring the coronation of Charles the Bald, flanked by Gelasius I and Gregory the Great. Gelasius' writings gave him a high status with posterity.

Gelasius was one of the most prolific authors of the early bishops of Rome. Over 100 Gelasian letters survive, although 49 of these are fragmentary, some as short as several lines. 6 treatises are extant that bear the name of Gelasius. According to Cassiodorus, the reputation of Gelasius attracted to his name other works not by him. Although his dogmatic letters connected to the Acacian Schism were widely circulated in late antiquity, and have been the focus of much scholarly interest, the majority of Gelasius' letters were in fact concerned with the administration of the church of suburbicarian Italy.

=== Decretum Gelasianum ===
The most famous of pseudo-Gelasian works is the list De libris recipiendis et non recipiendis ("On books to be received and not to be received"), also denominated the Decretum Gelasianum, which is believed to be connected to the pressure for orthodoxy during his pontificate and intended to be read as a decretal by Gelasius on the canonical and apocryphal books, which internal evidence reveals to be of later date. Thus the determination of the canon of Sacred Scripture has traditionally been attributed to Gelasius.

=== Gelasian Sacramentary ===
In the Latin Catholic tradition, the pseudo Gelasian Sacramentary is in fact a liturgical book that was derived from Roman sources and transcribed, with inclusion of native Gallican liturgical elements, near Paris in the middle of the 8th century. While including the texts of some prayers that Gelasius composed, he was not a principal author or compiler of the book. The manuscript (Vatican, Vatican Library, Reg. lat. 316 + Paris, National Library, ms. lat. 7193, fol. 41–56) is actually titled the Liber sacramentorum Romanae ecclesiae (Book of Sacraments of the Roman Church).

The attribution to Gelasius is premised in part at least on the chronicle of the Supreme Pontiffs that is denominated the Liber Pontificalis, which states of Gelasius that he "fecit etiam et sacramentorum praefationes et orationes cauto sermone et epistulas fidei delimato sermone multas" ("he also made prefaces to the sacraments and prayers in careful language and many epistles in polished language regarding the faith"). An old tradition linked the book to Gelasius, apparently based on the ascription of Walafrid Strabo to him of what evidently is this book.

== Legacy ==
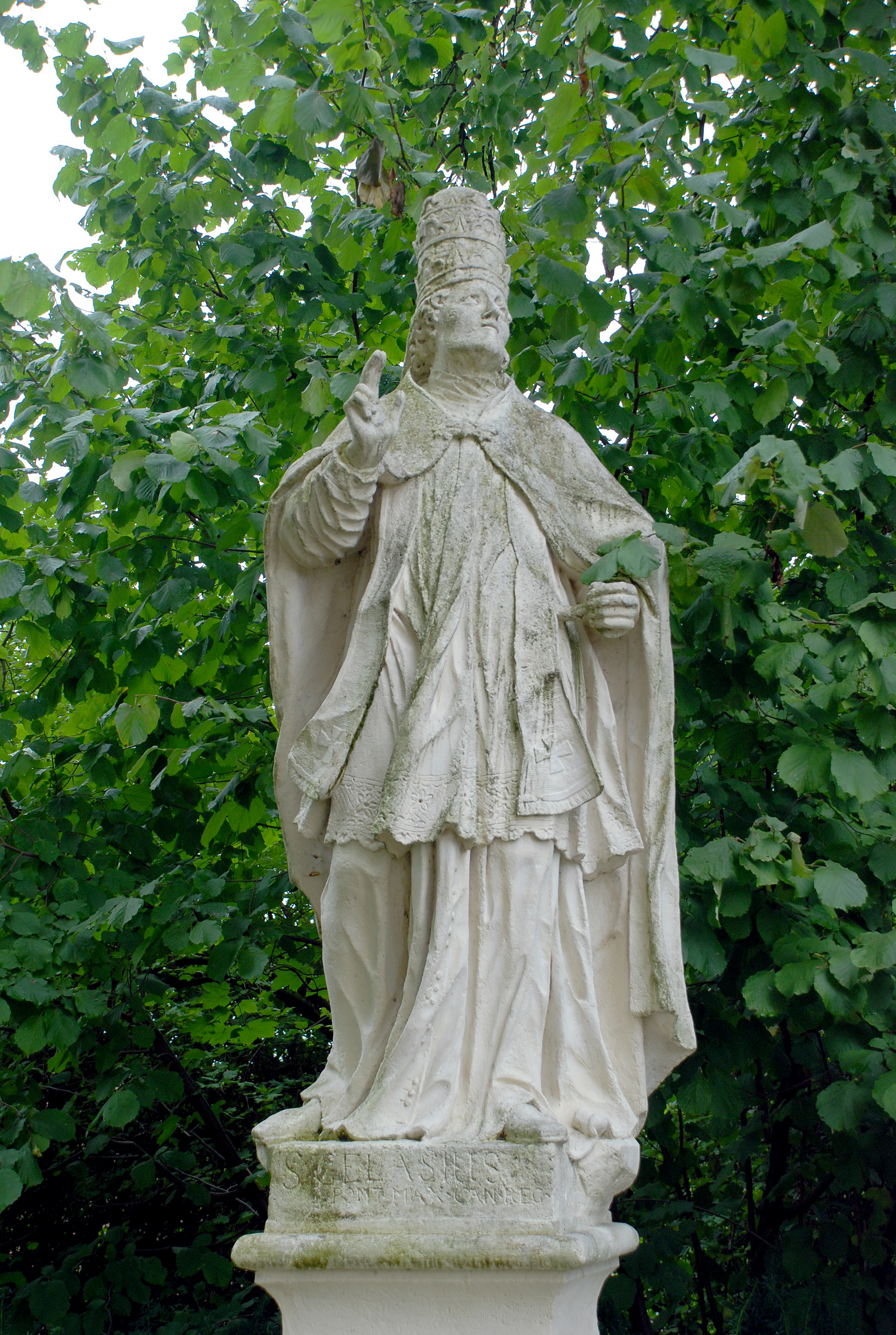
A statue of Gelasius I, at Schloss Stainz

Cardinal Giuseppe Maria Tomasi quoted a portion of a missal that was attributed to Gelasius in the Mass that was entitled 'Contra obloquentes' and published it. The section read:

Grant, We beseech Thee, O Lord, that we do not trouble ourselves about the contradiction of spurious minds, but once that very wickedness has been spurned let us pray that you suffer us neither to be frightened by the unjust criticisms, nor to be attracted to the insidious flatteries, but rather to love that which Thou dost command ....

In 1751, Pope Benedict XIV published this quotation within his Apostolic Constitution Providas that attacked freemasonry.

== See also ==
- List of popes
- Famuli vestrae pietatis
- Pope Saint Gelasius I, patron saint archive

== Literature ==
The primary source for the biography of Pope Saint Gelasius I, beside the Liber Pontificalis, is a vita written by Cassiodorus' pupil Dionysius Exiguus.

- Cohen, Samuel (2022). "Gelasius and the Ostrogoths: jurisdiction and religious community in late fifth‐century Italy". Early Medieval Europe. 30 (1): 20–44. doi:10.1111/emed.12519. ISSN 0963-9462
- Norman F. Cantor, Civilization of the Middle Ages.
- Neil, Bronwen, and Allen, Pauline (eds. and trans.). The letters of Gelasius I (492-496) : pastor and micro-manager of the Church of Rome. Turnhout, Belgium. pp. 8–9. ISBN 978-2-503-55299-6 OCLC 893407493
- Catholic Encyclopedia, 1908.
- Rudolf Schieffer, Gelasius I, in Lexikon des Mittelalters, Bd. 4 (1989), Sp. 1197.
- Friedrich Wilhelm Bautz (1990). "Gelasius I". In Bautz, Friedrich Wilhelm (ed.). Biographisch-Bibliographisches Kirchenlexikon (BBKL) (in German). Vol. 2. Hamm: Bautz. cols. 197–199. ISBN 3-88309-032-8.
- Ullmann, W., Gelasius I. (492–496): Das Päpsttum an der Wende der Spätantike zum Mittelalter, Stuttgart, 1981.

Catholic Church titles
Preceded by Felix III	Pope; 1 March 492 – 19 November 496	Succeeded by Anastasius II
