= Tribute penny =

Coin given to Jesus during his "Render unto Caesar" speech

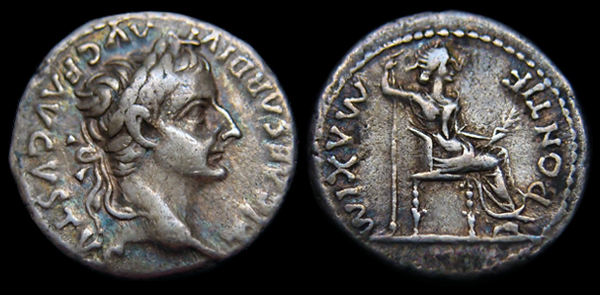
Denarius of the Emperor Tiberius, commonly referred to as "the Tribute Penny".

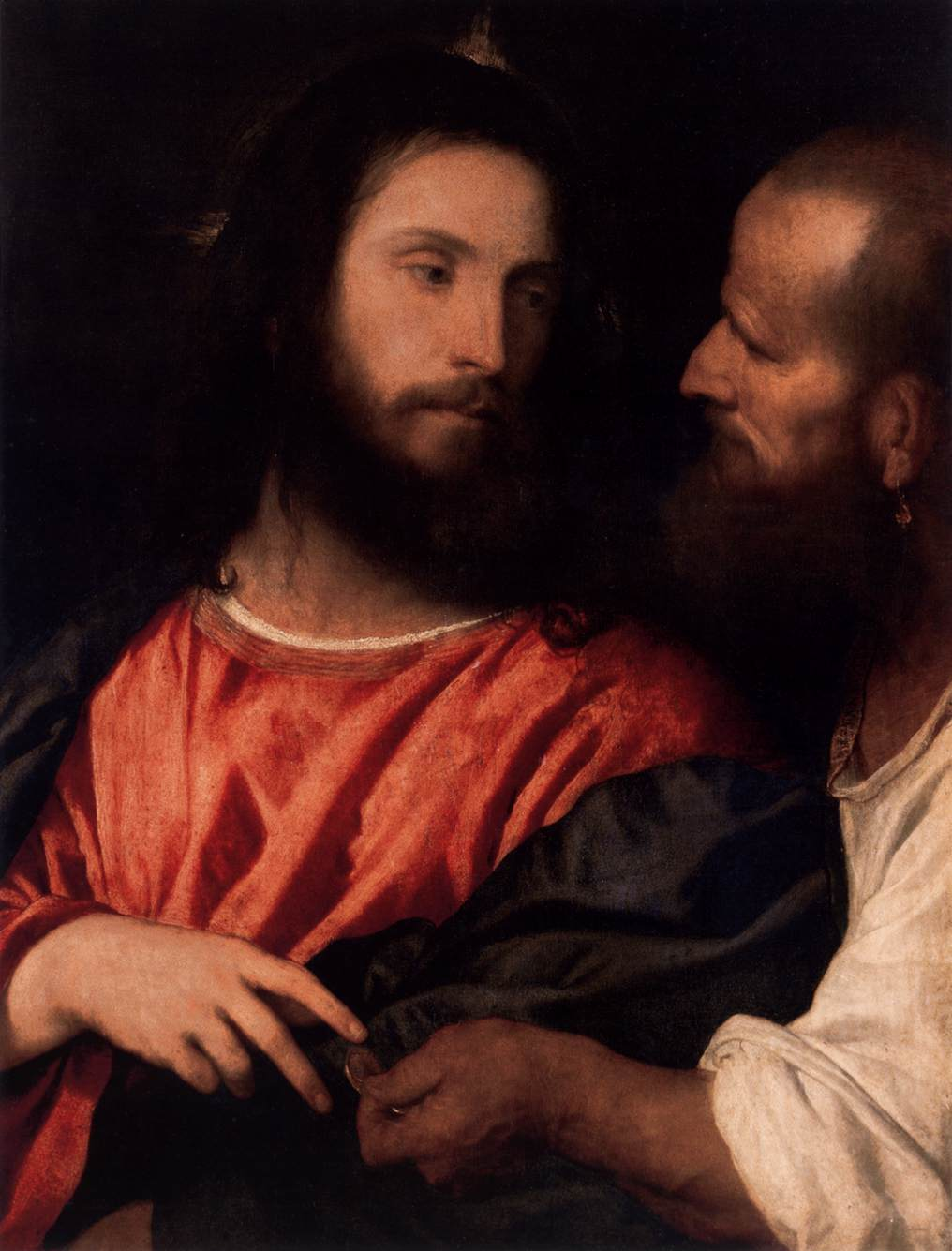
The Tribute Money, by Titian (1516), depicts Jesus being shown the tribute penny

The tribute penny was the coin that was shown to Jesus when he made his famous "Render unto Caesar" speech. The phrase comes from the King James Version of the gospel account: Jesus is asked, "Is it lawful to give tribute to Caesar, or not?" (Mark 12:14) and he replies, "bring me a penny, that I may see it" (Mark 12:15).

== Biblical account ==
One interpretation of the relevant passages is that the Pharisee or "spy" asking Jesus whether Roman taxes/tribute should be paid was attempting to entrap him into admitting his opposition to doing so, and that upon seeing that the coin was a tribute penny, Jesus avoided the trap by saying to it should be given back to Caesar, because it was his anyway.

The Greek text uses the word dēnarion, and it is usually thought by scholars that coin was a Roman denarius with the head of Tiberius. It is this coin that is sold and collected as the "tribute penny", and the Gospel story is an important factor in making this coin attractive to collectors. The inscription reads "Ti[berivs] Caesar Divi Avg[vsti] F[ilivs] Avgvstvs" ("Caesar Augustus Tiberius, son of the Divine Augustus"), claiming that after death Augustus had become a god. The reverse shows a seated female, usually identified as Livia depicted as Pax.

However, it has been suggested by some scholars that denarii were not in common circulation in Judaea during Jesus' lifetime and that the coin was more probably an Antiochan tetradrachm bearing the head of Tiberius, with Augustus on the reverse. Another suggestion often made is the denarius of Augustus with Gaius and Lucius on the reverse, while coins of Julius Caesar, Mark Antony and Germanicus are all considered possibilities.

== Gospel of Thomas ==
A similar episode occurs in the Gospel of Thomas (verse 100), but there the coin in question is gold.

== See also ==
- Coins in the Bible
