= Tribute (disambiguation) =

A tribute is wealth that one party gives to another as a sign of respect, submission, or allegiance.

Tribute may also refer to:

== Media and entertainment ==
- Tribute (play), a 1978 play by Bernard Slade
  - Tribute (1980 film), a Canadian film adaptation of the play
- Tribute, a 2008 novel by Nora Roberts
  - Tribute (2009 film), an American television film adaptation of the book
- Tribute (ballet), a 2005 ballet by Christopher d'Amboise
- Tribute (magazine), a Canadian entertainment industry magazine
- Tribute FM, an English-language radio station targeting a Libyan audience
- "Tribute" (Arrow), a 2017 television episode
- "The Tribute" (Tales of the Unexpected), a 1983 television episode
- Tribute, a Hunger Games contestant in the Hunger Games franchise

== Music ==
- Tribute act, a musical act that performs songs and mimics the style of the original act
- Tribute album, a collection of cover versions of a specific artist's songs
- Tribute Records, an American record label

=== Albums ===
- Tribute (Emilie-Claire Barlow album), 2001
- Tribute (John Newman album), 2013
- Tribute (Keith Jarrett album), 1990
- Tribute (Ozzy Osbourne album), 1987
- Tribute (Paul Motian album), 1974
- Tribute (Roy Rogers album), 1991
- Tribute (Yanni album), 1997
- Tribute: Maison de M-Flo, a tribute album to M-Flo, 2009

=== Songs ===
- "Tribute" (song), by Tenacious D, 2001
- "Tribute (Right On)", by the Pasadenas, 1988

== Products and businesses ==
- Tribute (ticket), a British Rail ticketing software system
- Tribute Ale, a UK ale made by St Austell Brewery
- Tribute Games, a Canadian video game developer
- Tribute Power Station, Tasmania, Australia
- Firebird Tribute, a 2000s German paraglider design
- Mazda Tribute, a 2000–2011 compact SUV
- Tribute (website), an American video-sharing website

== Other ==
- Cum tribute, sexual act which consists in ejaculating on a photograph or video of someone.

== See also ==
- Category:Musical tributes
- Homage (arts), a form of tribute in the arts
