= Oxford Reference =

Research website launched in 2012

- Screenshot Main page, signed in using The Wikipedia Library
- Website type: Reference
- Website: www.oxfordreference.com
- Launched: 2012

Oxford Reference (OR) is a research website launched by Oxford University Press (OUP) in 2012 which provides entries from reference works largely published by OUP, such as dictionaries, encyclopedias, and companions. It was preceded by Oxford Reference Online (ORO), which was launched in 2002.

== History ==
=== Oxford Reference Online ===
Oxford Reference Online (ORO) was first launched in 2002, including such titles as Concise Oxford English Dictionary and Fowler's Modern English Usage. Subscription costs started at £175 per year for schools, £500 for libraries and FE colleges, and £2,500 for large universities. The number of titles in ORO increased from the initial 13 to 31 titles by 2009.

=== Relaunch ===
In Autumn 2012, OUP decided to relaunch the website as Oxford Reference, incorporating the previous Oxford Reference Online as well as Oxford Reference Online Premium and Oxford Digital Reference Shelf into a single platform.

== Content ==
Oxford Reference draws from over 300 reference works to provide its entries, ranging from dictionaries, encyclopedias, quotation books, companions. With more than 2 million individual entries and new ones added monthly, sourced works primarily include publications by OUP, in addition to a small number of partner publications. As with its predecessor, pricing varies depending on the subscribing institution, although specific prices are not publicly available.
