= The Tribute Money (Copley) =

Painting by John Singleton Copley

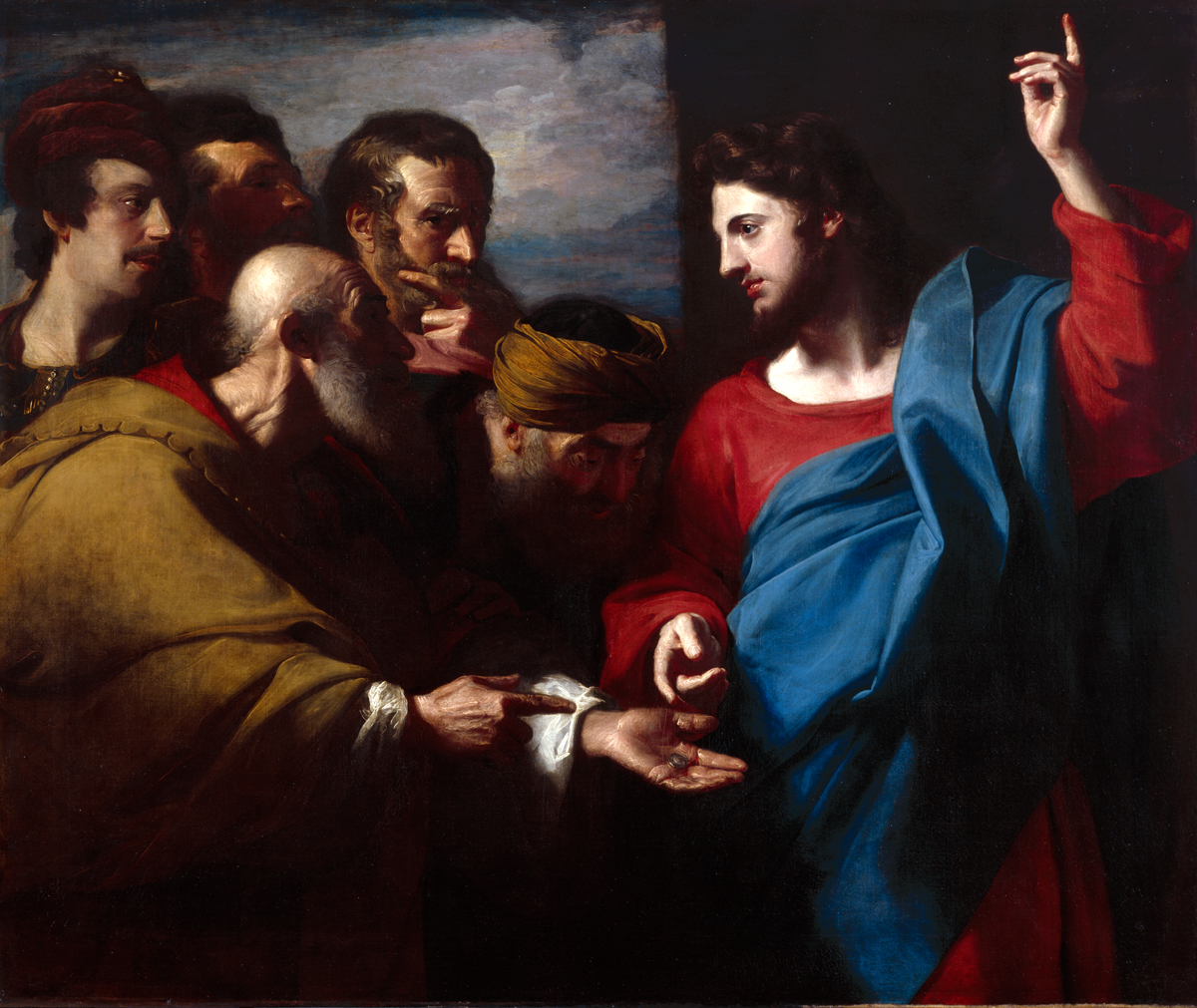
- Artist: John Singleton Copley
- Year: 1782
- Type: Oil on canvas, religious painting
- Dimensions: 128.3 cm × 153.7 cm (50.5 in × 60.5 in)
- Location: Royal Academy of Arts; London

The Tribute Money is a 1782 religious history painting by the Anglo-American artist John Singleton Copley. It illustrates a scene from the New Testament in which Jesus is confronted by the Pharisees about paying taxes to Rome. Christ responds by saying "Render unto Caesar the things that are Caesar's, and unto God the things that are God's".

On his arrival in London the Boston-born Copley enjoyed great success with his painting Watson and the Shark and was elected to membership of the Royal Academy of Arts in 1779. It was required that new members should provide a diploma work, but Copley was slow in producing his and it was only three years later that he gave it to the academy, which had recently moved into new headquarters at Somerset House.

== Bibliography ==
- Kamensky, Jane. A Revolution in Color: The World of John Singleton Copley. W. W. Norton & Company, 2016.
- Lasser, Ethan W. The Philosophy Chamber: Art and Science in Harvard's Teaching Cabinet, 1766-1820. Harvard Art Museums, 2017.
- Prown, Jules David. John Singleton Copley: In England, 1774-1815. National Gallery of Art, Washington, 1966.
