= Denarius =

Ancient Roman coin

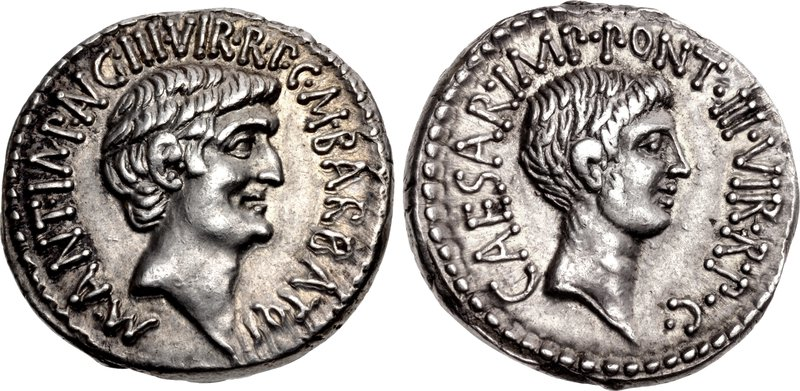
Denarius of Mark Antony and Octavian, struck at Ephesus in 41 BC. The coin commemorated the two men's defeat of Brutus and Cassius a year earlier as well as celebrating the new Second Triumvirate.

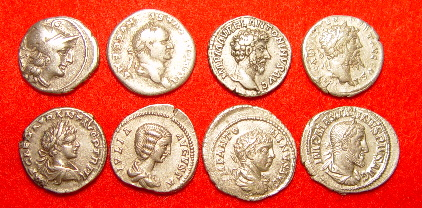
Top row (left to right): 157 BC Roman Republic, 73 AD Vespasian, 161 AD Marcus Aurelius, 194 AD Septimius Severus; Second row (left to right): 199 AD Caracalla, 200 AD Julia Domna, 219 AD Elagabalus, 236 AD Maximinus Thrax

The denarius (Latin: [deːˈnaːriʊs]; pl.: dēnāriī, Latin: [deːˈnaːriiː]; symbol: 𐆖) was the standard Roman silver coin from its introduction in the Second Punic War c. 211 BC to the reign of Gordian III (AD 238–244), when it was gradually replaced by the antoninianus. It continued to be minted in very small quantities, likely for ceremonial purposes, throughout the Tetrarchy (293–313).

The word dēnārius is derived from the Latin dēnī "containing ten", as it was originally worth 10 assēs. (Note: Its value was increased to 16 assēs in the middle of the 2nd century BC.) The word for "money" descends from it in Italian (denaro), Slovene (denar), Portuguese (dinheiro), and Spanish (dinero). Its name also survives in the dinar currency.

Its symbol is represented in Unicode as 𐆖 (U+10196), a numeral monogram that appeared on the obverse in the Republican period, denoting the 10 asses ("X") to 1 denarius ("I") conversion rate.

== History ==
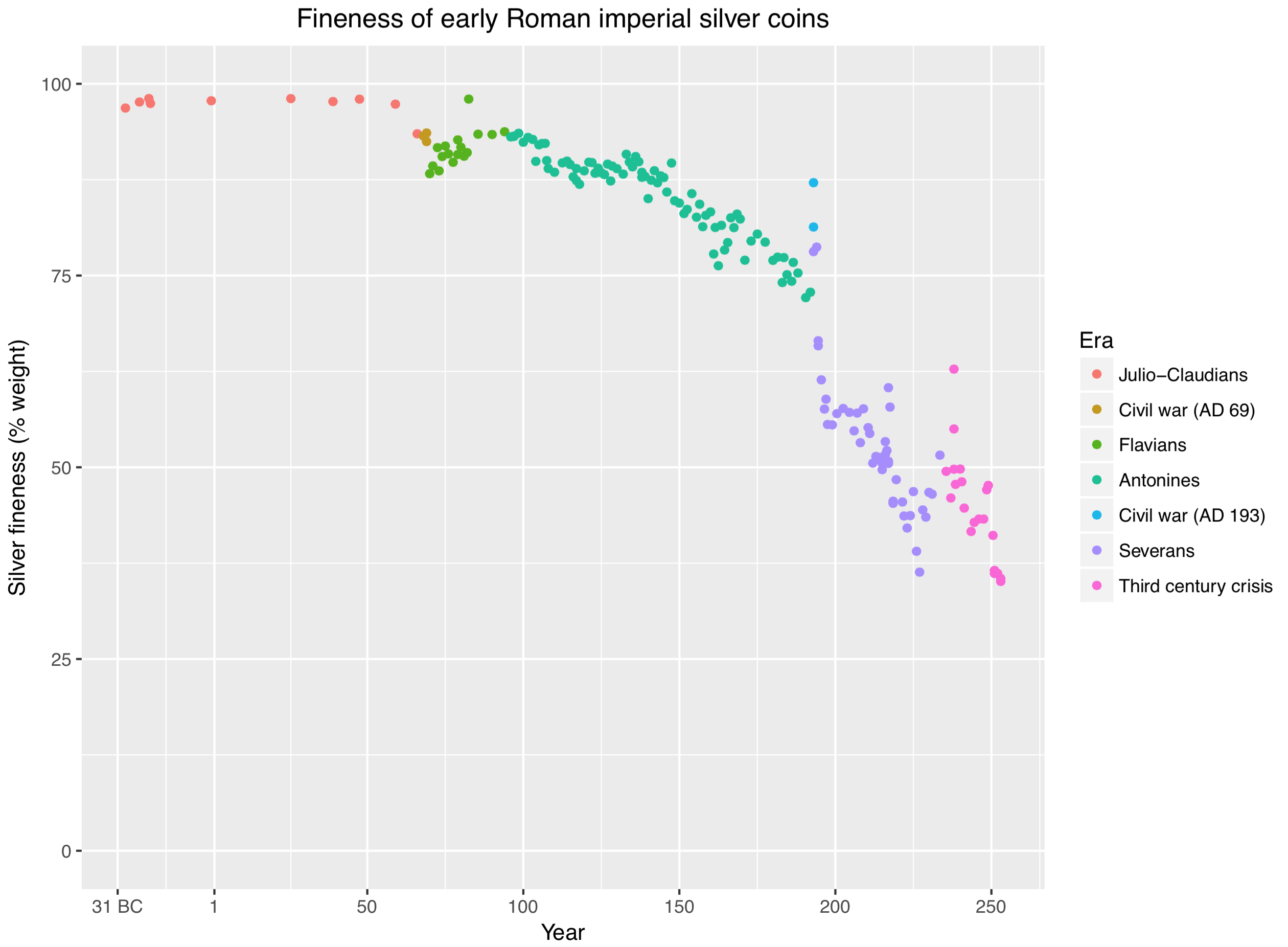
Starting with Nero in 64 AD, the Romans continuously debased their silver coins until, by the end of the 3rd century AD, hardly any silver was left.

A predecessor of the denarius was first struck in 269 or 268 BC, five years before the First Punic War, with an average weight of 6.81 grams, or 1/48 of a Roman pound. Contact with the Greeks had prompted a need for silver coinage in addition to the bronze currency that the Romans were using at that time. This predecessor of the denarius was a Greek-styled silver coin of didrachm weight, which was struck in Neapolis and other Greek cities in southern Italy. These coins were inscribed with a legend that indicated that they were struck for Rome, but in style they closely resembled their Greek counterparts. They were rarely seen at Rome, to judge from finds and hoards, and were probably used either to buy supplies or to pay soldiers.

The first distinctively Roman silver coin appeared around 226 BC. Classical historians have sometimes called these coins "heavy denarii", but they are classified by modern numismatists as quadrigati, a term which survives in one or two ancient texts and is derived from the quadriga, or four-horse chariot, on the reverse. The four-horse chariot, together with the two-horse chariot, or biga, used as a reverse type for some early denarii, provided the prototypes for the most common designs used on Roman silver coins for a number of years.

Rome overhauled its coinage shortly before 211 BC, and introduced the denarius alongside a short-lived denomination called the victoriatus. The denarius contained an average of 4.5 grams of silver, or 1/72 of a Roman pound, and was at first tariffed at ten asses, hence its name, which means 'tenner'. It formed the backbone of Roman currency throughout the Roman Republic and the early Empire.

The denarius began to undergo slow debasement toward the end of the republican period. Under the rule of Augustus (27 BC – 14 AD) its weight fell to 3.9 grams (a theoretical weight of 1/84 of a Roman pound). It remained at nearly this weight until the time of Nero (AD 37–68), when it was reduced to 1/96 of a pound, or 3.4 grams. Debasement of the coin's silver content continued after Nero. Later Roman emperors also reduced its weight to 3 grams in the late 3rd century.

The value at its introduction was 10 asses, giving the denarius its name, which translates as "containing ten". In about 141 BC, it was re-tariffed at 16 asses, to reflect the decrease in weight of the as. The denarius continued to be the main coin of the Roman Empire until it was replaced by the antoninianus in the early 3rd century AD. The coin was last issued, in bronze, under Aurelian between 270 and 275 AD, and in the first years of the reign of Diocletian.

== Debasement and evolution ==
| Year | Event | Weight | Purity | Notes |
|---|---|---|---|---|
| 267 BC | Predecessor | 6.81 g | ? | 1/48 pound. Equals 10 assēs, giving the denarius its name, which translates as "containing ten". The original copper coinage was weight-based, and was related to the Roman pound, the libra, which was about 325 g. The basic copper coin, the as, was to weigh 1 Roman pound. This was a large cast coin, and subdivisions of the as were used. The "pound" (libra, etc.) continued to be used as a currency unit, and survives e.g. in the British monetary system, which still uses the pound, abbreviated as £. |
| 211 BC | Introduction | 4.55 g | 95–98% | 1/72 pound. Denarius first struck. According to Pliny, it was established that the denarius should be given in exchange for ten pounds of bronze, the quinarius for five pounds, and the sestertius for two and a half. But when the as was reduced in weight to one ounce, the denarius became equivalent to 16 assēs, the quinarius to eight, and the sestertius to four, although they retained their original names. It also appears, from Pliny and other writers, that the ancient libra was equivalent to 84 denarii. |
| 200 BC | Debasement | 3.9 g | 95–98% | 1/84 pound. |
| 141 BC | Debasement | 3.9 g | 95–98% | 1/84 pound. Retariffed to equal 16 assēs due to the decrease in weight of the as. |
| 44 BC | Debasement | 3.9 g | 95–98% | Death of Julius Caesar, who set the denarius at 3.9 g. Legionary (professional soldier) pay was doubled to 225 denarii per year. |
| 14–37 AD | | 3.9 g | 97.5–98% | Tiberius slightly improved the fineness as he gathered his infamous hoard of 675 million denarii. |
| 64–68 | Debasement | 3.41 g | 93.5% | 1/96 pound. This more closely matched the Greek drachma. In 64 AD, Nero reduced the standard of the aureus to 45 to the Roman pound (7.2 g) and of the denarius to 96 to the Roman pound (3.30 g). He also lowered the denarius to 94.5% fine. Successive emperors lowered the fineness of the denarius; in 180 Commodus reduced its weight by one-eighth to 108 to the pound. |
| 85–107 | Debasement | 3.41 g | 93.5% | Reduction in silver content under Domitian |
| 148–161 | Debasement | 3.41 g | 83.5% | |
| 193–235 | Debasement | 3.41 g | 83.5% | Several emperors (193–235) steadily debased the denarius from a standard of 78.5% to 50% fine. In 212 Caracalla reduced the weight of the aureus from 45 to 50 to the Roman pound. They also coined the aes from a bronze alloy with a heavy lead admixture, and discontinued fractional denominations below the as. In 215 Caracalla introduced the antoninianus (5.1 g; 52% fine), a double denarius, containing 80% of the silver of two denarii. The coin invariably carried the radiate imperial portrait. Elagabalus demonetized the coin in 219, but the senatorial emperors Pupienus and Balbinus revived the antoninianus in 238 as the principal silver denomination. Successive emperors then debased it into a less intrinsically valuable billon coin (2.60 g; 2% fine). |
| 241 | Debasement | 3.41 g | 48% | |
| 274 | Double Denarius | 3.41 g | 5% | In 274, the emperor Aurelian reformed the currency and his denominations remained in use until the great recoinage of Diocletian in 293. Aurelian struck a radiate aurelianianus of increased weight (84 to the Roman pound) and fineness (5% fine) that was tariffed at five notional denarii (sometimes called "common denarii" or "denarii communes" by modern writers, although this phrase does not appear in any ancient text). The coin carried on its reverse the numeral XXI, or the Greek numeral κα (both meaning 21 or 20:1). Some scholars believe that this shows that the coin was equal to 20 sestertii (or 5 denarii), but it is more likely that it was intended to guarantee that it contained 1/20 or 5% of silver, and was thus slightly better than many of the coins in circulation. The aureus (minted at 50 or 60 to the Roman pound) was exchanged at rates of 600 to 1,000 denarii, equivalent to 120 to 200 aurelianiani. Rare fractions of billon denarii, and of bronze sestertii and assēs, were also coined. At the same time, Aurelian reorganized the provincial mint at Alexandria, and he minted an improved Alexandrine tetradrachmon that might have been tariffed at par with the aurelianianus. In 276, the emperor Tacitus briefly doubled the silver content of the aurelianianus and halved its tariff to 2.5 d.c. (hence coins of Antioch and Tripolis in Phoenicia carry the value marks X.I). Probus (276–282) immediately restored Aurelian's standard and tariff for the aurelianianus; this tariff remained official until the reform of Diocletian in 293. |
| 755 | Novus denarius (new penny) | | | Pepin the Short (r. 751–768), the first king of the Carolingian dynasty and father of Charlemagne, minted the novus denarius ("new penny"): 240 pennies were minted from one Carolingian pound. Thus, a single coin contained 21 grains of silver. Around 755, Pepin's Carolingian Reform established the European monetary system, which can be expressed as: 1 pound = 20 shillings = 240 pennies. Originally the pound was a weight of silver rather than a coin, and from a pound of pure silver 240 pennies were struck. The Carolingian Reform restored the silver content of the existing penny, which was a direct descendant of the Roman denarius. The shilling was equivalent to the solidus, the money of account that prevailed in Europe before the Carolingian Reform; the solidus originated from the Byzantine gold coin that was the foundation of the international monetary system for more than 500 years. Debts contracted before the Carolingian Reform were defined in solidi. For three centuries following the Carolingian Reform, the only coin minted in Europe was the silver penny. Shillings and pounds were units of account used for convenience to express large numbers of pence, not actual coins. The Carolingian Reform also reduced the number of mints, strengthened royal authority over the mints, and provided for uniform design of coins. All coins bore the ruler's name, initial, or title, signifying royal sanction of the quality of the coins. Charlemagne spread the Carolingian system throughout Western Europe. The Italian lira and the French livre were derived from the Latin word for pound. Until the French Revolution, the unit of account in France was the livre, which equalled 20 sols or sous, each of which in turn equalled 12 deniers. During the Revolution the franc replaced the livre, and Napoleon's conquest spread the franc to Switzerland and Belgium. The Italian unit of account remained the lira, and in Britain the pound-shilling-penny relationship survived until 1971. Even in England the pennies were eventually debased, leaving 240 pennies representing substantially less than a pound of silver, and the pound as a monetary unit became divorced from a pound weight of silver. After the breakup of the Carolingian Empire pennies were debased much faster, particularly in Mediterranean Europe, and in 1172 Genoa began minting a silver coin equal to four pennies. Rome, Florence, and Venice followed with coins of denominations greater than a penny, and late in the 12th century Venice minted a silver coin equal to 24 pennies. By the mid-13th century Florence and Genoa were minting gold coins, effectively ending the reign of the silver penny (denier, denarius) as the only circulating coin in Europe. |
| 785 | Penny | | | Offa, king of Mercia, minted and introduced to England a penny of 22.5 grains of silver. The coin's designated value, however, was that of 24 troy grains of silver (one pennyweight, or 1/240 of a troy pound, or about 1.56 grams); the difference represented a premium arising from minting the silver into coins (seigniorage). The penny led to the term "penny weight". The 240 actual pennies, at 22.5 grains each (1.5 grains less than the pennyweight because of seigniorage), weighed only 5,400 troy grains, known as a Saxon pound and later known as the tower pound, a unit used only by mints. The tower pound was abolished in the 16th century. However, 240 pennyweights (24 grains) made one troy pound of silver in weight, and the monetary value of 240 pennies also became known as a "pound". The silver penny remained the primary unit of coinage for about 500 years. |
| 790 | Penny | 1.76 g | 95–96% | Charlemagne's new penny had a smaller diameter but greater weight, with an average weight of 1.7 g and an ideal theoretical mass of 1.76 g. Its purity ranged from 95% to 96%. |
| c. 1527 | Penny | 1.58 g | 99% | The Tower pound of 5400 grains was abolished and replaced by the Troy pound of 5760 grains. |
| 1158 | Penny | | 92.5% | A standard of 92.5% silver purity (i.e. sterling silver) was instituted by Henry II in 1158 with the "Tealby Penny" — a hammered coin. |
| 1500s | Penny | | | By the 16th century it contained about a third the silver content of a Troy pennyweight of 24 grains. |
| 1915 | Penny | | | The penny, now struck in bronze, was worth around one-sixth of its value during the Middle Ages. British government sources suggest that there has been an 8700% price inflation since 1914, or an average of 4.2% annually. |

== Value, comparisons and silver content ==
Marco Sergio Silo: 116–115 BC
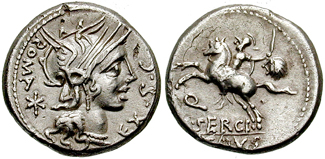
First side of the image: Helmeted head of Roma
Second side of the image: Galloping Equites holding a sword and a barbarian's head
Denarius: Sergio 1

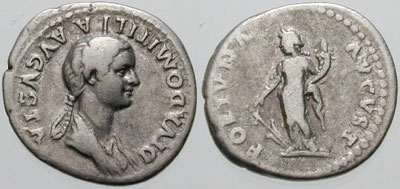
Flavia Domitilla, wife of Vespasian and mother of Titus and Domitian

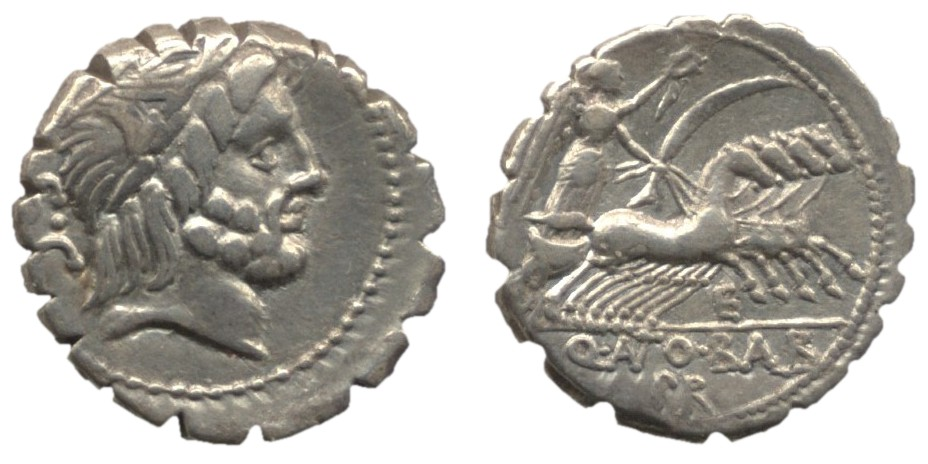
Quintus Antonius Balbus (c. 83–82 BC)

1 gold aureus = 2 gold quinarii = 25 silver denarii = 50 silver quinarii = 100 bronze sestertii = 200 bronze dupondii = 400 copper asses = 800 copper semisses = 1,600 copper quadrantes

It is difficult to give even rough comparative values for money from before the 20th century, as the range of products and services available for purchase was so different. During the republic (509 BC – 27 BC), a legionary earned 112.5 denarii per year (0.3 denarii per day). Under Julius Caesar, this was doubled to 225 denarii/yr, with soldiers having to pay for their own food and arms, while during the reign of Augustus, a centurion received at least 3,750 denarii per year and one of the highest rank received 15,000 denarii.

By the late Roman Republic and early Roman Empire (c. 27 BC), a common soldier or unskilled laborer would be paid 1 denarius/day (with no tax deductions), around 300% inflation compared to the early period. Using the cost of bread as a baseline, this pay equates to around US$20 in 2013 terms. Expressed in terms of the price of silver, and assuming 0.999 purity, a 1/10 troy ounce denarius had a precious metal value of around US$2.60 in 2021.

At the height of the Roman Empire, a sextarius (546 ml or about 2 1/4 American cups) of ordinary wine cost roughly one dupondius (1/8 of a denarius); after Diocletian's Edict on Maximum Prices was issued in 301 AD, the same item cost 8 debased common denarii – 6300% inflation.

Silver content plummeted across the lifespan of the denarius. Under the Roman Empire (after Nero) the denarius contained approximately 50 grains, 3.24 grams, or 0.105 ozt (about 1/10 troy ounce). The fineness of the silver content varied with political and economic circumstances. From a purity of greater than 90% silver in the 1st century AD, the denarius fell to under 60% purity by 200 AD, and plummeted to 5% purity by 300 AD. By the reign of Gallienus, the antoninianus was a copper coin with a thin silver wash.

== Influence ==
In the final years of the 1st century BC, Tincomarus, a local ruler in southern Britain, started issuing coins that appear to have been made from melted down denarii. The coins of Eppillus, issued around Calleva Atrebatum around the same time, appear to have derived design elements from various denarii, such as those of Augustus and M. Volteius.

Even after the denarius was no longer regularly issued, it continued to be used as a unit of account, and the name was applied to later Roman coins in a way that is not understood. The Arabs who conquered large parts of the land that once belonged to the Eastern Roman Empire issued their own gold dinar. The name survived in France as that of a coin, the denier. The denarius also survives in the common Arabic name for a currency unit, the dinar, which was used in pre-Islamic times and is still used in several modern Arab nations. The major currency unit in the former Principality of Serbia, the Kingdom of Serbia, and the former Yugoslavia was the dinar, and it is still used in present-day Serbia. The Macedonian currency denar is also derived from the Roman denarius. The Italian word denaro, the Spanish word dinero, the Portuguese word dinheiro, and the Slovene word denar, all meaning money, are also derived from Latin denarius. The United Kingdom's pre-decimal currency of pounds, shillings, and pence, used until 1971, was abbreviated as £sd, with "d" referring to denarius and standing for penny.

== Use in the Bible ==
In the New Testament, the gospels refer to the denarius as a day's wage for a common laborer (Matthew 20:2, John 12:5). In the account of the Third Seal (the black horse) in the Book of Revelation, a choinix ("quart") of wheat and three quarts of barley were each valued at one denarius. Bible scholar Robert H. Mounce says the prices of the wheat and barley described in the vision appear to be ten to twelve times their normal levels in ancient times. Revelation thus describes a condition where basic goods are sold at greatly inflated prices. Thus, the black horse rider depicts times of deep scarcity or famine, but not of starvation. Apparently, a choinix of wheat was the daily ration of one adult. Thus, in the conditions pictured by Revelation 6, the normal income for a working-class family would buy enough food for only one person. The less costly barley would feed three people for one day's wages.

The denarius is also mentioned in the Parable of the Unforgiving Servant and in the Parable of the Good Samaritan (Luke 10:25–37). The Render unto Caesar passage in Matthew 22:15–22 and Mark 12:13–17 uses the word (δηνάριον) for the coin held up by Jesus; in the King James Bible, the word is translated as "tribute penny". It is commonly thought to be a denarius with the head of Tiberius.

== See also ==
- Denarius of L. Censorinus – for the detailed description of a specific Roman denarius
- Siliqua
- Dupondius
- French denier
- Gold Dinar
- Ides of March Coin
- Macedonian denar
- Sestertius
- Solidus (coin)
- Tribute penny
- Pay (Roman army)
