= Ostrogothic Papacy =

Period of Catholic history

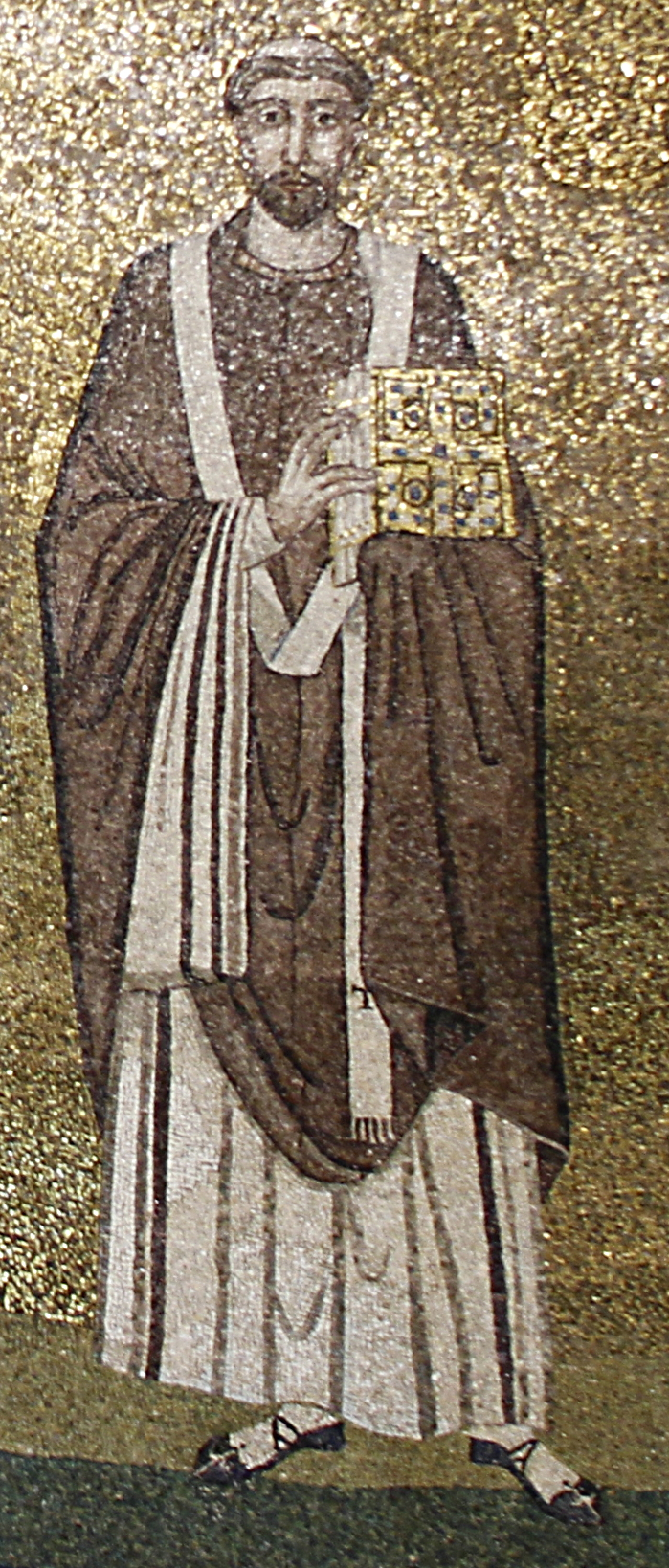
Pope Symmachus's (498–514) triumph over Antipope Laurentius is the first recorded example of simony in papal history.

The Ostrogothic Papacy was a period from 493 to 537 where the papacy was strongly influenced by the Ostrogothic Kingdom, if the pope was not outright appointed by the Ostrogothic King. The selection and administration of popes during this period was strongly influenced by Theodoric the Great and his successors Athalaric and Theodahad. This period terminated with Justinian I's invasion of Italy during the Gothic War (535–554), establishing the Byzantine Papacy (537–752).

According to Howorth, "while they were not much interfered with in their administrative work, so long as they did not themselves interfere with politics, the Gothic kings meddled considerably in the selection of the new popes and largely dominated their election. Simony prevailed to a scandalous extent, as did intrigues of a discreditable kind, and the quality and endowments of the candidates became of secondary importance in their chances of being elected, compared with their skill in corrupting the officials of the foreign kings and in their powers of chicane." According to the Catholic Encyclopedia, "[Theodoric] was tolerant towards the Catholic Church and did not interfere in dogmatic matters. He remained as neutral as possible towards the pope, though he exercised a preponderant influence in the affairs of the papacy."

== Overview ==
Ten popes reigned between,
493 and 537:
- Pope Gelasius I (492–496)
- Pope Anastasius II (496–498)
- Pope Symmachus (498–514)
- Pope Hormisdas (514–523)
- Pope John I (523–526)
- Pope Felix IV (526–530)
- Pope Boniface II (530–532)
- Pope John II (533–535)
- Pope Agapetus I (535–536)
- Pope Silverius (536–537)

During this period, there were
four Ostrogothic kings:

- Theodoric the Great (474–526) ["King of Italy" from 493]
- Athalaric (526–534)
- Theodahad (534–536)
- Witiges (536–540)

During this period there were
three Byzantine emperors:

- Anastasius I (491–518)
- Justin I (518–527)
- Justinian I (527–565)

== History ==
=== Since the fall of Rome ===
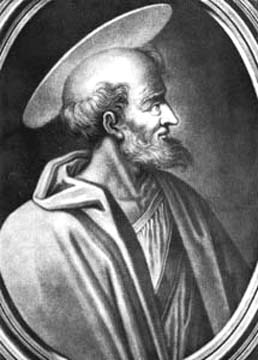
Pope Simplicius (468–483), the pope during the end of the Western Roman Empire

Pope Simplicius (468–483) was the pope who witnessed the final overthrow of the Western Roman Empire, and fell ill in 483. The papal election of March 483 was the first to take place without the existence of a Western Roman emperor. While Simplicius still lived, the praetorian prefect, Caecina Decius Maximus Basilius, called together the Roman Senate, Roman clergy, and the leading local bishops in the Imperial Mausoleum. Simplicius had issued an admonitio declaring that no election of his successor should be valid without the consent of Basilius. Basilius was both the leader of the Roman aristocracy and the Chief Minister of Odoacer the "king of Italy". Simplicius was succeeded by Pope Felix III (483–492), Pope Gelasius I (492–496), and Pope Anastasius II (496–498).

=== The first schism ===
The role of the Ostrogoths became clear in the first schism. On November 22, 498, both Pope Symmachus and Antipope Laurentius were elected pope. Symmachus was approved by the Roman Senate, but both Byzantine Emperor Anastasius I and the Gothic King Theodoric the Great originally supported Laurentius, who was installed in the Lateran Palace.

Symmachus and Laurentius resorted to bribing Theodoric for his support, with funds from the Roman aristocrats who supported them. This is the first documented case of papal simony, wherein both candidates attempted to bribe the royal councilors, if not Theodoric himself, to influence his choice. According to DeCormenin and de Lahaye, also influencing Theodoric to side with Symmachus and expel Laurentius from Rome was his fear that the latter was too influenced by the Byzantine ruler, but according to Richards this is "simply not borne out by the evidence." In announcing his decision, Theodoric cited the majority of clerical support and the fact of prior ordination.

On March 1, 499, Symmachus declared to a synod in Old Saint Peter's Basilica his plan for campaign finance reform in future sede vacantes. Laurentius was among those who signed his statute, having been appointed as Bishop of Nuceria in consolation for having lost his claim to the papacy. Symmachus decreed that reigning bishops would be able to designate their own successors, ending the participation of the laity for at least a half-century.

When the supporters of Laurentius tried to depose Symmachus for having celebrated Easter according to the wrong calendar, Theodoric called the pope before him in Ariminum to resolve the matter. When Symmachus arrived, he discovered that the charges against him included unchastity and maladministration of church property, and fled back to Rome. His flight bolstered the Laurentian party, who succeeded in persuading Theodoric to send a visitor to Rome to have Easter celebrated according to the Greek calendar and to convene a synod to consider the charges against Symmachus. Peter of Altinum, the bishop of Istria, came to Rome to oversee the new Easter celebration and took over the administration of the Holy See pending the outcome of the synod.

In the first two sessions, the assembled Italian bishops were unable to agree on the appropriate procedures to settle the matter, but the third session acquitted Symmachus. Theodoric took a rather hands-off approach to the synod, refusing repeated requests for him to travel to Rome and resolve the matter personally. According to Richards:

There is something really rather shocking about the way in which the assembled bishops of the Catholic church fell over themselves to persuade a heretic barbarian to decide who the pope should be. It makes nonsense of the idea of an articulation of papal monarchial theory in which the church was superior to the lay authorities. Both the Symmachian and Laurentian factions appealed to the king for arbitration in 489 and both sides accepted his convocation of a synod. Symmachus, indeed, finally submitted a decision about his case to God and the king, hardly the sort of behavior one would accept from a champion of papal supremacy. Indeed, the regularity with which both sides invoked the intervention of the king suggests a widely held view of his impartiality.

Despite the synod, Laurentius was able to return to Rome, take over much of the papal patrimony and churches of the city, and rule from the Lateran Palace while Symmachus remained in St. Peter's.

=== After Symmachus ===
According to Richards, "the death of Pope Symmachus in July 514 was a crucial test for the election regulations after nearly sixteen controversial years of Symmachian rule." However, the "Symmachian old guard" controlled a supermajority of the priests and deacons and thus were able to elect Pope Hormisdas (514–523) after only seven days. Hormisdas was likely appointed by Symmachus himself, "a procedure which was implicit in the electoral regulations." Hormisdas had prepared complicated written instructions for his envoys to the East long before his election and kept Theodoric well apprised of his negotiations with the Byzantines.

Hormisdas was succeeded by Pope John I (523–526). Theodoric married his daughters to the kings of Burgundy, the Visigoths, and Vandals, fellow adherents of Arianism. However, Clovis, king of the Franks, renounced Arianism in 506, as did Sigismund of Burgundy in 516 – acts that could possibly describe the act of having "converted to Catholicism." In 523, Eutharic, king of the Visigoths, ceased persecuting non-Arians, around the same time that the Eastern Church began its persecution of Arians. Theodoric created an Ostrogothic navy and sent an emissary to the East, headed by Pope John I himself in 526.

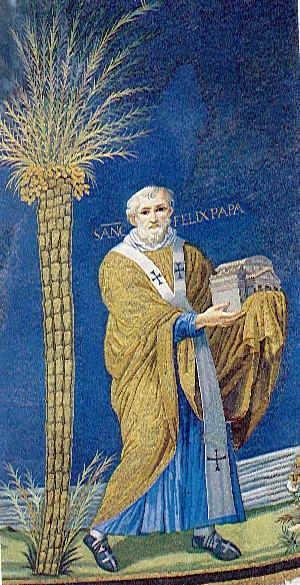
Pope Felix IV (526–530) was the first successor of Symmachus to have trouble designating a successor.

John I was succeeded by Pope Felix IV (526–530) with the recommendation of Theodoric and his election was confirmed by Athalaric. He was thus appointed "for all practical purposes" by Theodoric. The process of predecessor appointment was used without serious issue until the death of Felix IV, who had given his pallium to Pope Boniface II on his deathbed in 530 and decreed excommunication of any who refused to accept the succession. The Roman Senate disliked the lack of election and denounced Felix, affirming a decree of Pope Anastasius II which had prohibited the practice of a pope designating a successor. Boniface II was supported only by a minority of the clergy, with the larger share supporting Dioscorus, with only Dioscorus's death halting the schism.

Boniface II attempted to re-entrench the practice of appointing his successor, but the public outcry was too great, resulting in a highly disputed election in 532 characterized by widespread accounts of bribery and coercion, which resulted in Pope John II (the first to take a papal name). Pope John was chosen by Athalaric to avoid a split between the Byzantine and Gothic factions. Athalaric, the Ostrogoth king, forced John II to approve decrees that banned any private agreements to elect a pope and enacting limits on the amount of money that could be spent during a papal election (an early example of campaign finance reform). In fact, Athalaric himself was able to engineer the election of Pope Silverius, the son of Pope Hormisdas, upon John II's death.

Theodahad threw his support behind Pope Agapetus I and was thus "well placed to coerce the new pope Agapetus, for he had been elected with his support." Theodahad also played a decisive role in the selection of Pope Silverius (536–537), the legitimate son of Hormisdas.

== Effects of Justinian's reconquest ==
After Justinian I retook Rome in the Gothic War (535–554), "to interfere in the papacy had been one of the first things Justinian had done as soon as his armies got a foothold in Italy." Long before he had completed his victory over the Ostrogoths, Justinian I had his commander Belisarius depose the pro-Gothic Pope Silverius (536–537) and install Pope Vigilius (537–555), the former papal apocrisiarius to Constantinople, in his place. Silverius died and Vigilius was ordained in 537, while the Goths rallied and laid siege to Rome. In 542, King Totila recaptured Rome and by the time Justinian's new general Narses recaptured the city in 552, Vigilius was no longer in Rome.

== Bibliography ==
- Baumgartner, Frederic J. 2003. Behind Locked Doors: A History of the Papal Elections. Palgrave Macmillan. ISBN 0-312-29463-8.
- Coulombe, Charles A. 2003. Vicars of Christ: A History of the Popes. Citadel Press. ISBN 0-8065-2370-0.
- DeCormenin, Louis Marie and Vicomte de Louis-Marie de Lahaye. 1857. A Complete History of the Popes of Rome. James L. Gihon. p. 78.
- Henry Hoyle Howorth. 1913. Saint Augustine of Canterbury. Google Books.
- Richards, Jeffrey. 1979. The popes and the papacy in the early Middle Ages, 476–752.
