= Anastasius (consul 518) =

6th-century Byzantine statesman

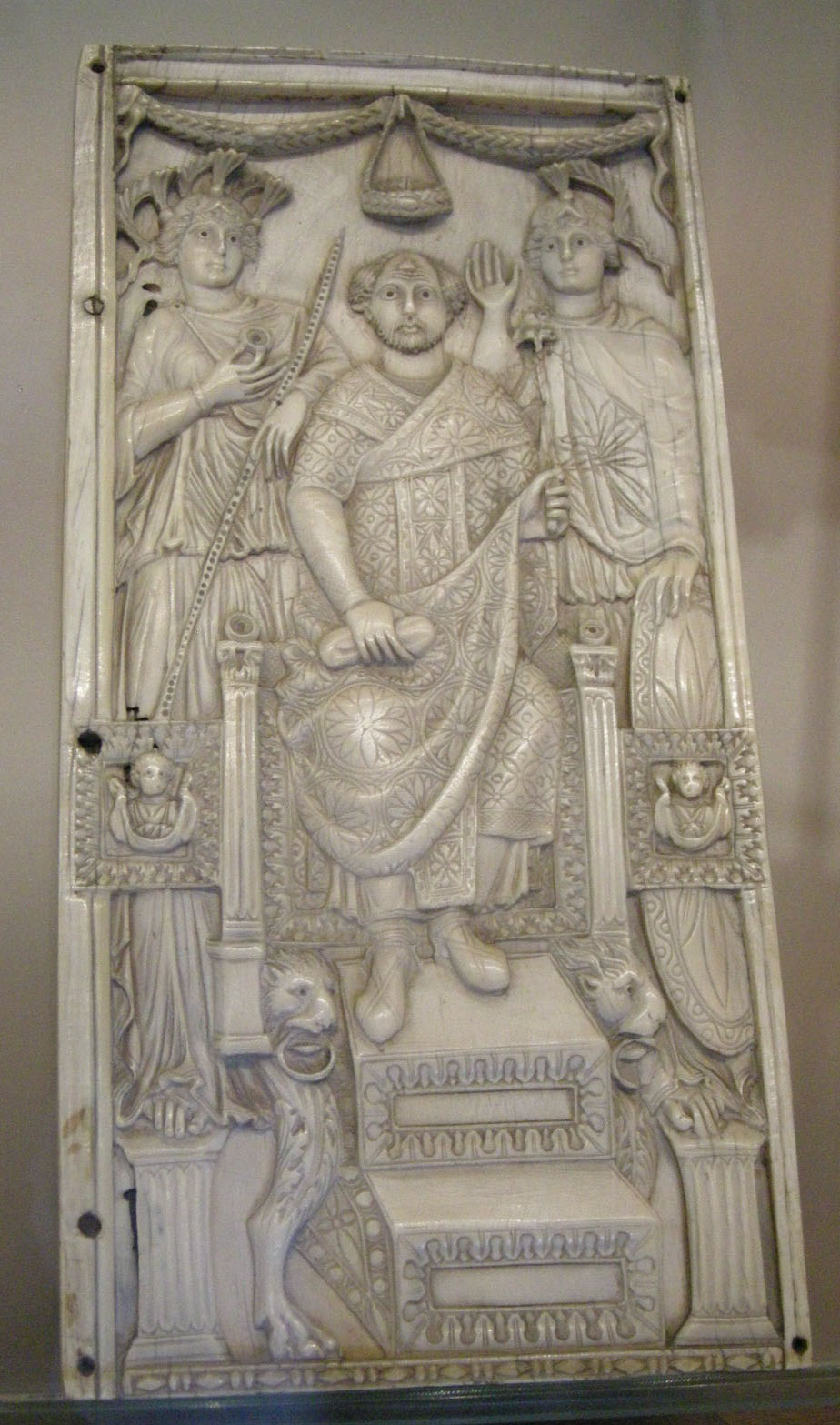
Consular diptych of Fl. Anastasius Paulus Probus Moschianus Probus Magnus

Flavius Anastasius Paulus Probus Moschianus Probus Magnus (Greek: Άναστάσιος) was a Roman aristocrat who served as consul of the Eastern Roman Empire in 518 AD.

During his consulship, Emperor Anastasius I Dicorus died and was succeeded by Justin I.

== Family ==
His grandfather was Sabinianus Magnus, a major military commander who served as magister militum per Illyricum between 479 and 481. Sabinianus Magnus established the political fortunes of the family through both military command and close ties to the imperial court.

Sabinianus Magnus had two sons who became consuls: Sabinianus and Moschianus. Moschianus was the father of Probus Magnus and married the niece of Emperor Anastasius I.

He may have been the brother of Flavius Anastasius Paulus Probus Sabinianus Pompeius Anastasius, consul in 518. If so, Anastasius was the son of Sabinian, consul in 505, and of a niece of emperor Anastasius I, making him the emperor's grandnephew.

His daughter Juliana was married to Marcellus (brother of Justin II).

== Sources ==
- Martindale, John R., ed. (1980). The Prosopography of the Later Roman Empire: Volume II, AD 395–527. Cambridge: Cambridge University Press. ISBN 0-521-20159-4.
- Christian Settipani fr:Continuité des élites à Byzance durante les siècles obscurs. Les princes caucasiens et l'Empire du VIe au IXe siècle, 2006

Political offices
Preceded by Agapetus, Anastasius Paulus Probus; Sabinianus Pompeius Anastasius	Roman consul 518	Succeeded by Justin I, Eutharic
