= Sabinianus =

Sabinianus may refer to:

- Sabinian (proconsul), Marcus Asinius Sabinianus, leader of a revolt in 240 against Roman Emperor Gordian III
- Sabinianus Magnus (died 481), general of the Eastern Roman Empire
- Sabinianus (consul 505) (fl. 505–508), politician and general of the Eastern Roman Empire
- Pope Sabinian (c. 530–606), Latin spelling Sabianus, bishop of Rome
- Marcus Iunius Rufinus Sabinianus, Roman consul in 155
- Gaius Vettius Sabinianus Julius Hospes, Roman consul circa 176
- Gaius Vettius Gratus Sabinianus, Roman consul in 221
- Gaius Vettius Gratus Atticus Sabinianus, Roman consul in 242
- Anastasius (consul 517), consul in 517, full name Anastasius Paulus Probus Sabinianus Pompeius

== See also ==
- Sabinian (disambiguation)
