= 512 =

Calendar year

512 in various calendars
- Gregorian calendar: 512; DXII
- Ab urbe condita: 1265
- Assyrian calendar: 5262
- Balinese saka calendar: 433–434
- Bengali calendar: −82 – −81
- Berber calendar: 1462
- Buddhist calendar: 1056
- Burmese calendar: −126
- Byzantine calendar: 6020–6021
- Chinese calendar: 辛卯年 (Metal Rabbit); 3209 or 3002 — to — 壬辰年 (Water Dragon); 3210 or 3003
- Coptic calendar: 228–229
- Discordian calendar: 1678
- Ethiopian calendar: 504–505
- Hebrew calendar: 4272–4273
- Hindu calendars
- Vikram Samvat: 568–569
- Shaka Samvat: 433–434
- Kali Yuga: 3612–3613
- Holocene calendar: 10512
- Iranian calendar: 110 BP – 109 BP
- Islamic calendar: 113 BH – 112 BH
- Javanese calendar: 398–400
- Julian calendar: 512; DXII
- Korean calendar: 2845
- Minguo calendar: 1400 before ROC 民前1400年
- Nanakshahi calendar: −956
- Seleucid era: 823/824 AG
- Thai solar calendar: 1054–1055
- Tibetan calendar: ལྕགས་མོ་ཡོས་ལོ་ (female Iron-Hare); 638 or 257 or −515 — to — ཆུ་ཕོ་འབྲུག་ལོ་ (male Water-Dragon); 639 or 258 or −514

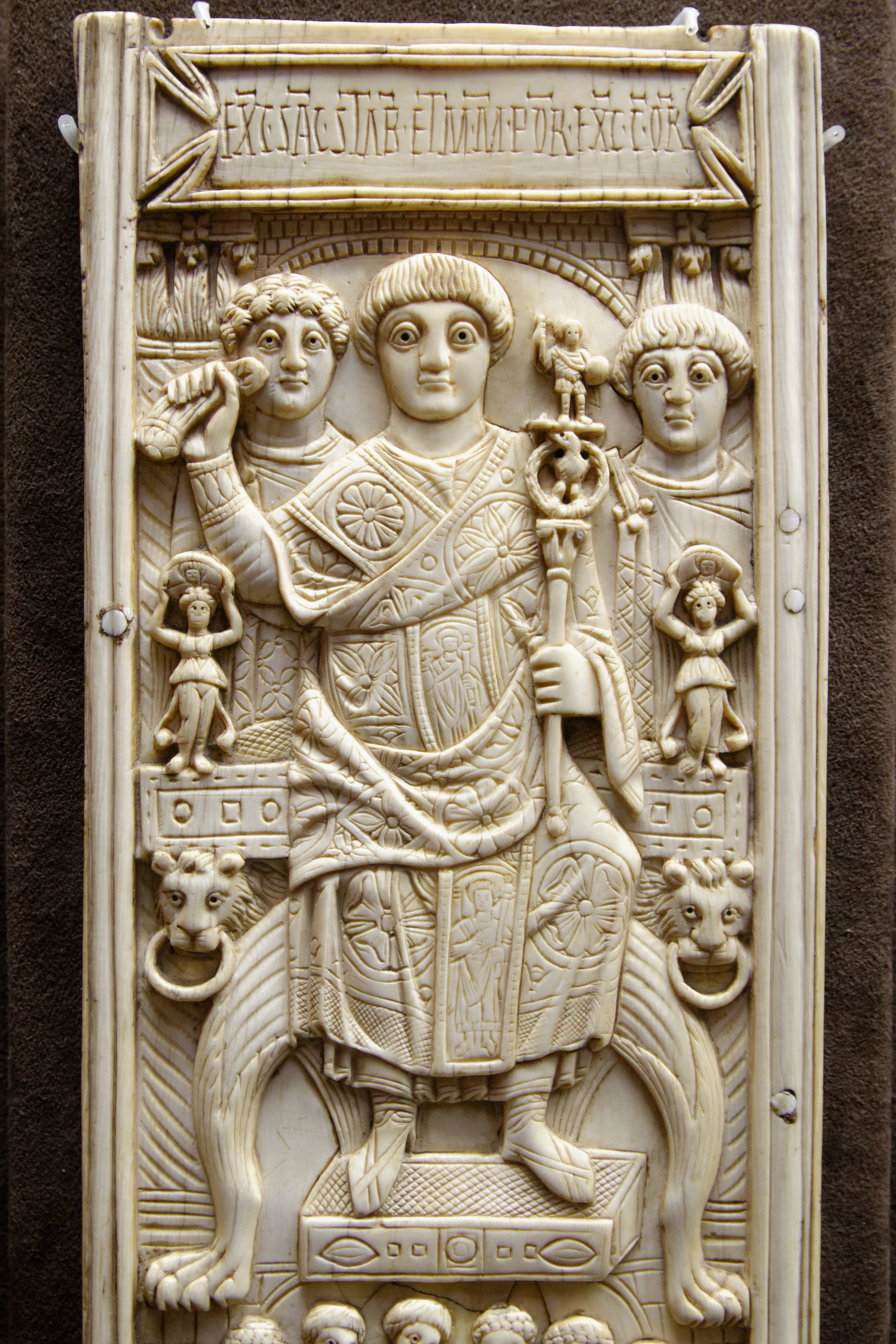
Areobindus in his consular robes

Year 512 (DXII) was a leap year starting on Sunday of the Julian calendar. In the Roman Empire, it was known as the Year of the Consulship of Paulus and Moschianus (or, less frequently, year 1265 Ab urbe condita). The denomination 512 for this year has been used since the early medieval period, when the Anno Domini calendar era became the prevalent method in Europe for naming years.

== Events ==
=== By place ===
==== Byzantine Empire ====
- Emperor Anastasius I ends a period of moderate eclectic policy, and starts strongly favoring his own monophysitist beliefs.
- Areobindus, Byzantine general, is proclaimed emperor during a riot at Constantinople but refuses to take part in the usurpation.
- Anastasius I constructs a wall from the Black Sea to the Sea of Marmara, to protect Constantinople from raiding Bulgars and Slavs.

==== Europe ====
- King Theodoric the Great grants citizens on Mount Vesuvius exemption from taxes, after a severe eruption in southeastern Italy.
- The Ostrogoths conquer the Frankish province Rouergue (Southern Gaul).

==== Asia ====
- The island nation of Usan-guk is conquered by the Silla dynasty (Korea), under general Kim Isabu.

=== By topic ===
==== Literature ====
- The first written text in the Arabic alphabet is recorded at Zabad (Syria).

== Births ==
- David, Welsh bishop and saint (approximate date)
- Eutychius, patriarch of Constantinople (approximate date)
- Maurus, Roman abbot and saint (d. 584)
- Wu Mingche, general of the Chen dynasty (d. 578)
- Lady Xian, Chinese general (d. 602)

== Deaths ==
- Areobindus, Byzantine general and politician
- Wang Baoming, empress of Southern Qi (b. 455)
