= 530 =

Calendar year

530 in various calendars
- Gregorian calendar: 530; DXXX
- Ab urbe condita: 1283
- Assyrian calendar: 5280
- Balinese saka calendar: 451–452
- Bengali calendar: −64 – −63
- Berber calendar: 1480
- Buddhist calendar: 1074
- Burmese calendar: −108
- Byzantine calendar: 6038–6039
- Chinese calendar: 己酉年 (Earth Rooster); 3227 or 3020 — to — 庚戌年 (Metal Dog); 3228 or 3021
- Coptic calendar: 246–247
- Discordian calendar: 1696
- Ethiopian calendar: 522–523
- Hebrew calendar: 4290–4291
- Hindu calendars
- Vikram Samvat: 586–587
- Shaka Samvat: 451–452
- Kali Yuga: 3630–3631
- Holocene calendar: 10530
- Iranian calendar: 92 BP – 91 BP
- Islamic calendar: 95 BH – 94 BH
- Javanese calendar: 417–418
- Julian calendar: 530; DXXX
- Korean calendar: 2863
- Minguo calendar: 1382 before ROC 民前1382年
- Nanakshahi calendar: −938
- Seleucid era: 841/842 AG
- Thai solar calendar: 1072–1073
- Tibetan calendar: ས་མོ་བྱ་ལོ་ (female Earth-Bird); 656 or 275 or −497 — to — ལྕགས་ཕོ་ཁྱི་ལོ་ (male Iron-Dog); 657 or 276 or −496

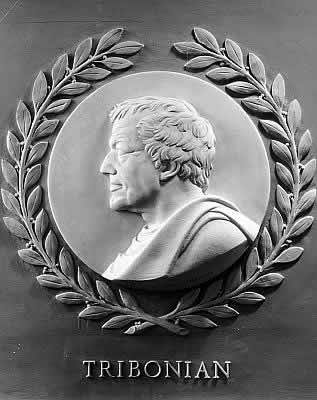
Bas-relief of Tribonian (c. 500–547)

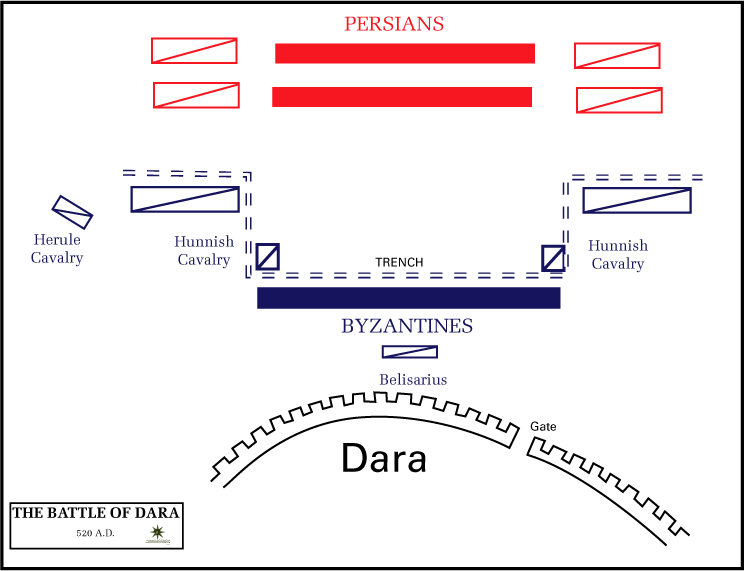
Battle of Dara (part of the Iberian War)

Year 530 (DXXX) was a common year starting on Tuesday of the Julian calendar. In the Roman Empire, it was known as the Year of the Consulship of Lampadius and Probus (or, less frequently, year 1283 Ab urbe condita). The denomination 530 for this year has been used since the early medieval period, when the Anno Domini calendar era became the prevalent method in Europe for naming years.

== Events ==
=== By place ===
==== Byzantine Empire ====
- December 15 – Emperor Justinian I selects a second commission to excerpt and codify the writings of the jurists on Roman law. This becomes the Digest (Pandects).
- Tribonian becomes quaestor sacri palatii and chief editor of the compilation of the old Roman lawyers' writings.

==== Persia ====
- Spring – Battle of Dara: Belisarius and Hermogenes (magister officiorum) defeat a combined Persian-Arab army of 50,000 men at Dara (modern Turkey), by entrenching his infantry in a refused position in the centre line, then carrying out a cavalry envelopment to culminate a classic defensive-offensive battleplan.
- Summer – Battle of Satala: A Byzantine cavalry force (30,000 men) under command of Sittas defeats a major Persian invasion into Roman Armenia.

==== Africa ====
- King Hilderic is deposed by his cousin Gelimer after a seven-year reign. Gelimer restores Arianism as the official religion of the Vandal Kingdom and puts Hilderic in prison along with other supporters.
- Justinian I sends an embassy to Carthage to negotiate with Gelimer. Gelimer replies: “Nothing is more desirable than that a monarch should mind his own business.”

==== China ====
- Emperor Xiao Zhuang Di is arrested and imprisoned in a Buddhist temple at Jinyang (Shanxi). He is succeeded by Chang Guang Wang, who becomes the new ruler of Northern Wei.
- Xiao Tong, eldest son of emperor Wu Di, compiles the Wen Xuan (Literary Selections), a famous anthology of works dating from the Han to the Liang dynasty (approximate date).

=== By topic ===
==== Art ====
- The mosaic synagogue floor from Maon (Judea) is made. It is now kept at the Israel Museum in Jerusalem (approximate date).
- The Vishnu Temple at Deogarh, Uttar Pradesh (India) is built.

==== Religion ====
- September 22 – Pope Felix IV dies at Rome after a tenure of four years, two months and 13 days, in which he has condemned semi-pelagianism. He is succeeded by Boniface II, who becomes the 55th pope.
- October 14 – Dioscorus is elected as antipope in the Lateran Palace, but he dies within a month, thus ending the schism.
- Brendan, Irish abbot, allegedly climbs to the top of Mount Brandon to look for the Americas (approximate date).

== Births ==
- Colmán of Cloyne, Irish monk (d. 606)
- Dallán Forgaill, Irish poet (approximate date)
- Sophia, Byzantine Empress (approximate date)
- Venantius Fortunatus, Latin poet and bishop (approximate date) (d. 600)
- Xuan Di, emperor of the Chen dynasty (d. 582)

== Deaths ==
- September 22 – Pope Felix IV
- October 14 – Antipope Dioscorus
- Cador, king of Dumnonia (England)
- Dhu Nuwas, king of Himyar (b. circa 450)
- Drest III, king of the Picts (approximate date)
- Erzhu Rong, general of Northern Wei (b. 493)
- Xiao Baoyin, prince of Southern Qi (b. 487)
