= Ennodius Messala =

Roman senator

Ennodius Messala was an Italian senator in Ostrogothic Italy. He was appointed consul for 506 with Areobindus Dagalaifus Areobindus as his colleague.

His father was Anicius Probus Faustus, the leading supporter of Pope Symmachus in the Laurentian schism, and his brother was Rufius Magnus Faustus Avienus, one of the consuls for 502. According to Magnus Felix Ennodius, Messala had a literary bent (Ep. 8.3, 9.12), and in 512 was engaged to a wealthy girl. (Ep. 9.26.35)

Political offices
Preceded by Theodorus; Sabinian	Roman consul 506 with Dagalaifus Areobindus	Succeeded by Anastasius Augustus III; Venantius
