= Caecina Decius Faustus Albinus =

Roman senator

- Died: 525? Verona?
- Office: Roman consul (493); Praetorian prefect of Italy (500–503)
- Political party: Greens

Caecina Decius Faustus Albinus (fl. 490–525) was a Roman politician during the reign of Theodoric the Great. He held the consulship with Eusebius in 493. Albinus is best known for being identified with the senator whom Boethius defended from accusations of treasonous correspondence with the Eastern Roman Empire by the referandarius Cyprianus, only to have Cyprianus then accuse Boethius of the same crime.

Albinus was son of Caecina Decius Maximus Basilius (consul in 480), and brother of Avienus (consul in 501), Theodorus (consul in 505) and Inportunus. John Moorhead argues that the brothers were on different sides of the Laurentian schism, with Albinus and Avienus supporting Symmachus and Theodorus and Inportunus supporting Laurentius. The Liber Pontificalis reports that Albinus and his wife Glaphyra, during the pontificate of Symmachus, built a basilica dedicated to Saint Peter on the Via Trebana at the 27th milepost, on the farm of Pacinianus.

In 523 or 524, the referandarius Cyprianus accused Albinus of treasonous correspondence before king Theodoric in his court at Verona. Boethius, who later explained himself as having "countless times interposed my authority to protect wretched men from danger when they were hounded by the endless false accusations of the barbarians in their continuous and unpunished lust for wealth", stepped up to shield Albinus. Cyprianus then accused Boethius of the same crime; Boethius was imprisoned, and eventually executed. In the words of Thomas Hodgkin, "Albinus disappears from the narrative, but was probably condemned along with Boethius".

Political offices
Preceded by Anastasius Augustus; Rufus	Roman consul 493; With: Eusebius	Succeeded by Turcius Rufius Apronianus Asterius; Praesidius
Preceded by Petrus Marcellinus Felix Liberius	Praetorian prefect of Italy; 500–503	Succeeded by Cassiodorus the Elder
