= Sabinian =

Sabinian is a given name which may refer to:

- Sabinian of Troyes (died 275), Christian martyr and saint
- Sabinian (proconsul), leader of a revolt in 240 against Roman Emperor Gordian III
- Sabinian (consul 505)
- Pope Sabinian (c. 530–606), bishop of Rome

== See also ==
- Sabinian school, a school of law in ancient Rome named after Masurius Sabinus
- Savinian and Potentian (died 390), Christian martyrs and saints
- Sabinianus (disambiguation)
