= Inportunus =

Roman senator

Inportunus (fl. 509–523) was a Roman aristocrat who lived during the reign of Theodoric the Great. He held the consulship without colleague in 509.

Inportunus was the son of Caecina Decius Maximus Basilius (consul in 480), and brother of Albinus (consul in 493), Avienus (consul in 501), and Theodorus (consul in 505). John Moorhead argues that the brothers were on different sides of the Laurentian schism, with Albinus and Avienus supporting Symmachus and Theodore and Inportunus supporting Laurentius. Moorhead also suggests that king Theodoric appointed Inportunus consul for 509 "as a sop to the adherents of the vanquished Laurentius."

While organizing the games to celebrate his consulate, Inportunus and his brother Theodorus were accused by the Greens of attacking them and killing one of their members. A surviving letter of Theodoric commands both of them to provide answers to these allegations before the tribunal of the inlustrius Caelianus and Agapitus.

In 523, he was part of the entourage of Pope John I, who had been ordered by king Theodoric to proceed to Constantinople and obtain a moderation of Emperor Justin's decree of 523 against the Arians. Theodoric threatened that if John should fail in his mission, there would be reprisals against the orthodox Catholics in the West. Other senators accompanying Pope John included his brother Theodorus, the ex-consul Agapitus, and the patrician Agapitus.

Political offices
Preceded by Basilius Venantius; Celer	Roman consul 509	Succeeded by Boethius
