= Moschianus =

Moschianus may refer to:

- Moschianus (consul 512), Flavius Moschianus (fl. 512), politician of the Eastern Roman Empire
- Anastasius Paulus Probus Moschianus Probus Magnus, consul in 518
