= Petrus (consul 516) =

Roman politician

Flavius Petrus (fl. 506–516) was a Roman politician during the reign of Theodoric the Great. He held the consulship without colleague in 516.

According to Cassiodorus, Petrus was from a distinguished noble family (parentum luce conspicuus). Ennodius wrote him a congratulatory letter in 506 for receiving an office, likely of lower rank than vir inlustris. In 510 or 511, Theodoric asked the praefectus urbi Argolicus to appoint Petrus to the Senate.

In 516, Petrus obtained the Roman consulate in the West sine collega (without colleague), after which nothing is known about him.

Political offices
Preceded by Florentius & Procopius Anthemius	Roman consul 516	Succeeded by Agapitus & Anastasius Paulus Probus; Sabinianus Pompeius Anastasius
