= Probus (consul 513) =

Probus (floruit 510–513) was a Roman politician and consul for 513.

He came from a family renowned for its learning, and he himself is praised for his culture by Ennodius (Letters, VIII.21, autumn 510).

In 512 he was a vir illustris; the following year he held the consulate (CIL V, 6266).

== Bibliography ==
- Martindale, John R., ed. (1992). "Fl. Probus 9". The Prosopography of the Later Roman Empire: Volume III, AD 527–641. Cambridge: Cambridge University Press. p. 913. ISBN 0-521-20160-8.

Political offices
| Preceded by Paulus; Flavius Moschianus | Consul of the Roman Empire; 513 with Taurus Clementinus Armonius Clementinus | Succeeded by Cassiodorus |
