= Pope John I =

Head of the Catholic Church from 523 to 526

Pope Saint John I
- Bishop of Rome
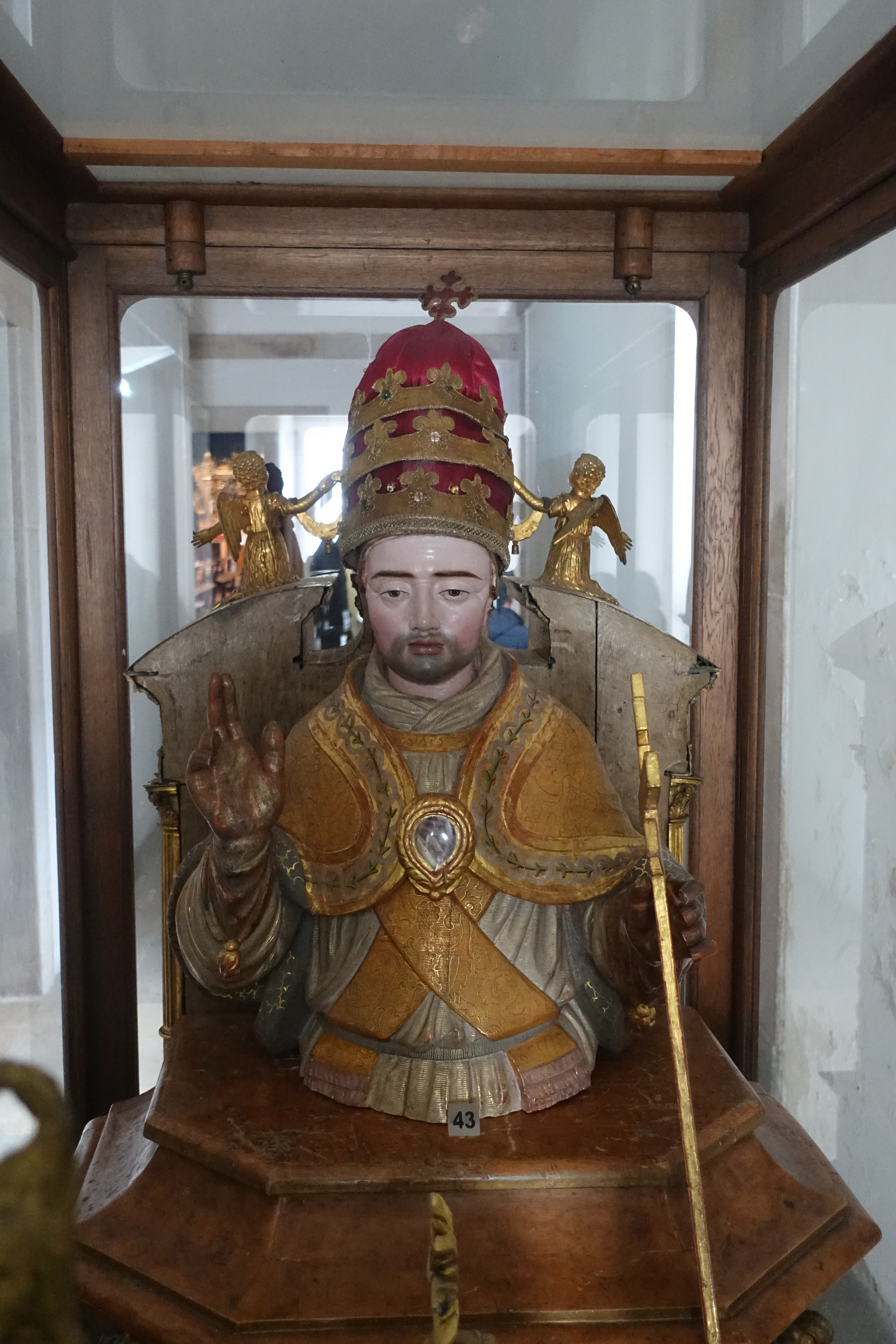
- Head reliquary of St. Pope John I in the New Cathedral of Coimbra, Portugal
- Church: Catholic Church
- Papacy began: 13 August 523
- Papacy ended: 18 May 526
- Predecessor: Hormisdas
- Successor: Felix IV

Orders
- Created cardinal: ca. 495 by Gelasius I
- Rank: Priest

Personal details
- Born: Sena Iulia, Italy, Western Roman Empire
- Died: 18 May 526 Ravenna, Ostrogothic Kingdom

Sainthood
- Feast day: 18 May

Pope John I (Latin: Ioannes I; died 18 May 526) was the bishop of Rome from 13 August 523 to his death on 18 May 526. He was a native of Siena (or the "Castello di Serena", near Chiusdino), in Italy. Pope John I played a pivotal role in standardizing how the Western Church calculated the date of Easter, with the help of the monk Dionysius Exiguus, in 525. He was sent on a diplomatic mission to Constantinople by the Ostrogoth King Theoderic to negotiate better treatment for Arians. Although John was relatively successful, upon his return to Ravenna, Theoderic had him imprisoned for allegedly conspiring with Constantinople. The frail pope died of neglect and ill-treatment.

== Early life ==
While a deacon in Rome, John is known to have been a partisan of the Antipope Laurentius, for in a libellus written to Pope Symmachus in 506, John confessed his error in opposing him, condemned Peter of Altinum and Laurentius, and begged pardon of Symmachus. He would then be the "Deacon John" who signed the acta (ecclesiastic publication) of the Roman synod of 499 and 502; the fact the Roman church only had seven deacons at the time makes identifying him with this person very likely. He may also be the "Deacon John" to whom Boethius, the 6th-Century philosopher, dedicated three of his five religious tractates, or treatises, written between 512 and 520.

== Pontificate ==
John was very frail when he was elected to the papacy. Despite his protests, Pope John was sent by Theodoric the Great, the Arian king of the Ostrogoths in Italy, to Constantinople to secure the moderation of a decree, issued in 523, of Justin I, emperor of the Eastern Roman Empire, against the Arians. King Theoderic threatened that if John should fail in his mission, there would be reprisals against the non-Arian Christians in the West. John proceeded to Constantinople with a considerable entourage: including his fellow bishops Ecclesius of Ravenna, Eusebius of Fanum Fortunae, and Sabinus of Campania. His secular companions were the Roman senators Flavius Theodorus, Inportunus, and the Patrician Agapitus.

Emperor Justin is recorded as receiving John honorably and promised to do everything the embassy asked of him, with the exception that those converting from Arianism to Orthodoxy would not be "restored" (i.e., allowed to retain their place in the Orthodox hierarchy as deacons, priests, or bishops). Although John was successful in his mission, when he returned to Ravenna, Theoderic's capital in Italy, Theoderic had John arrested on the suspicion of having conspired with Emperor Justin. John was imprisoned at Ravenna, where he died of neglect and ill treatment. His body was transported to Rome and buried in the Basilica of St. Peter.

The Liber Pontificalis credits John with making repairs to the cemetery of the martyrs Nereus and Achilleus on the Via Ardeatina, that of Felix and Adauctus, and the cemetery of Priscilla.

== Veneration ==
Pope John I is depicted in art as looking through the bars of a prison or imprisoned with a deacon and a subdeacon. He is venerated at Ravenna and in Tuscany. His feast day is 18 May, the anniversary of the day of his death (whereas it had formerly been 27 May).

== See also ==
- List of Catholic saints
- List of popes

Catholic Church titles
Preceded by Hormisdas	Pope; 523–526	Succeeded by Felix IV
