= Adamantius (praefectus urbi) =

5th-century politician of the Eastern Roman Empire

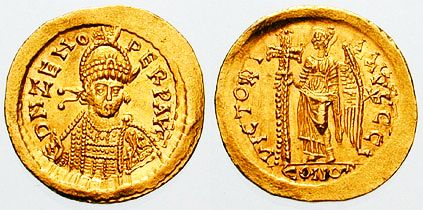
Zeno AV Solidus. Constantinople Mint, D N ZENO-PERP AVG, facing helmeted and cuirassed bust, holding shield, spear behind / VICTORI-A AVGGG and officina letter, Victory standing left, holding long cross, star in right field, CONOB in exergue.

Adamantius (Ancient Greek: Ἀδαμάντιος; fl. 474–479) was a politician of the Eastern Roman Empire, praefectus urbi of Constantinople (474–479), patricius and honorary consul.

Adamantius was the son of Vivianus, consul in 463 and praetorian prefect of the East; his brother was Paulus, consul in 512.

Between 474 and 479, Adamantius held the office of praefectus urbi of Constantinople.

In 479 he is attested as patricius. That year he was conferred consular honours by Emperor Zeno and sent as envoy to the rebel general Theodoric the Great. He went to Thessalonica, where he freed the ex-consul Iohannes from an enraged mob, and joined with Sabinianus Magnus at Edessa; they reached Theodoric in Dyrrachium, where they started negotiations, but Zeno recalled them back when the rebels kept on attacking imperial territories.
