= Agapitus (consul 517) =

Flavius Agapitus (floruit 502–523) was a Roman politician during the reign of Theodoric the Great. He held the consulship with Flavius Anastasius Paulus Probus Sabinianus Pompeius Anastasius as his colleague in 517.

He started his public career late in life, having lived in seclusion in Liguria, where Ennodius made his acquaintance. Ennodius helped Agapitus obtain a high position at the court of Theodoric the Great in 502, and subsequently was appointed urban prefect of Rome. His Prefecture is mentioned in a legal document from the time of Theodoric. During his tenure as urban prefect, or shortly afterwards, he was made Patrician and settled many cases affecting the Senate. Ennodius comments that he had achieved a favorable reputation in the Senate, which possibly led to his appointment as consul.

In 523, Agapitus was part of the entourage of Pope John I, who had been ordered by king Theodoric to proceed to Constantinople and obtain a moderation of Emperor Justin's decree of 523 against the Arians. Theodoric threatened that if John should fail in his mission, there would be reprisals against the orthodox Catholics in the West. Other senators accompanying Pope John included Inportunus, Theodorus, and the patrician Agapitus.

Political offices
Preceded by Constantius	Praefectus urbi of Rome; 508 - 509	Succeeded by Artemiodorus
Preceded by Petrus	Consul of the Roman Empire; 517 with Flavius Anastasius Paulus Probus Sabinianus Pompeius Anastasius	Succeeded by Anastasius Paulus Probus Moschianus Probus Magnus
