= Flavius Licerius Firminus Lupicinus =

Gallo-Roman scholar

Flavius Licerius Firminus Lupicinus (fl. sixth century) was a late Gallo-Roman aristocrat and scholar.

Originally from Arles, Firminus Lupicinus was the only son of Euprepia, who was the sister of Magnus Felix Ennodius, the Bishop of Pavia, whose letters are the principal source for what little we know about Firminus Lupicinus. A Christian and a member of the Gallo-Roman nobility related to the Anicii, in AD 503 he was involved in a dispute over some lands he had received from his mother, which he was in danger of losing. In 504 Firminus Lupicinus was enrolled in the school run by Deuterius at Mediolanum, and his education was supervised by his uncle Ennodius.

Firminus Lupicinus is principally remembered for his role in the preservation of some of Julius Caesar's works. He in particular was a co-editor of one of the recensions of Book 2 of Commentary on the Gallic Wars.

== Sources ==
- Cameron, Alan, The Last Pagans of Rome, Oxford University Press (2010)
- Martindale, John R., ed. (1980). The Prosopography of the Later Roman Empire: Volume II, AD 395–527. Cambridge: Cambridge University Press. ISBN 0-521-20159-4.
- Mommaerts, T. S., and Kelley, D. H., The Anicii of Gaul and Rome in Fifth-Century Gaul: A Crisis of Identity? (ed. Drinkwater, John and Elton, Hugh), Cambridge University Press (2002)
