= Iohannes (consul 467) =

Roman politician

- Born: c. 440
- Died: c. 482 (aged 42); Dyrrachium, Byzantine Empire (modern Durrës)
- Occupation: politician
- Office: Consul (467); Magister officiorum Praetorian prefect of Illyricum

Iohannes (Greek: Ίωάννης; c. 440–482) was a politician of the Eastern Roman Empire.

== Biography ==
His family came from Lychnidus, but he was from Epidamnus (Dyrrachium). Probably he was born in c. 440. In 467 he was consul posterior, chosen by the Eastern court, together with Illustrius Pusaeus. Between 467 and 468 he was comes et magister officiorum, and later praetorian prefect of Illyricum (he was in office in 479); he was known as a fair administrator and a protector of arts.

In 479, during the revolt of Theodoric Strabo, Iohannes was in Thessalonica, where his life was in danger twice. First he was assaulted by an enraged mob and saved by the priests and the local nobles; later he was threatened by rebel soldiers and was saved by the arrival of the patricius Adamantius. Together with Sabinianus Magnus, he successfully suggested that Emperor Zeno refuse a truce with Theodoric and keep fighting him.

Iohannes died when he was 42 years old. Christodorus wrote two poems in his honour.

== Bibliography ==
- Martindale, John R., ed. (1980). "Iohannes 29". The Prosopography of the Later Roman Empire: Volume II, AD 395–527. Cambridge: Cambridge University Press. pp. 600–601. ISBN 0-521-20159-4.

Preceded by Leo Augustus III; Tatianus (in Gaul)	Roman consul 467 with Pusaeus	Succeeded by Anthemius Augustus II
