= Paulus (consul 512) =

Flavius Paulus

Consul of the Roman Empire

Flavius Paulus (Greek: Παῦλος; fl. 512) was a Roman politician.

He was the son of Vivianus, consul in 463, and brother of Adamantius, praefectus urbi of Constantinople.

Paulus was first appointed patricius and later, in 512, consul. For his appointment to the consulate, he lent 1000 pounds of gold from Zenodotus, but he was not able to repay it, as his father, who was renowned for his generosity, had distributed much money during his office; it was emperor Anastasius I who paid back the debt in his place, giving another 1000 pounds of gold to Paul as a gift.

He was a zealous Christian, and Severus of Antioch dedicated him a treaty against Eutyches.

== Bibliography ==
- Martindale, John R., ed. (1980). "Fl. Paulus 34". The Prosopography of the Later Roman Empire: Volume II, AD 395–527. Cambridge: Cambridge University Press. p. 854. ISBN 0-521-20159-4.

Political offices
Preceded by Arcadius Placidus Magnus Felix; Flavius Secundinus	Consul of the Roman Empire; 512 with Flavius Moschianus	Succeeded by Probus; Taurus Clementinus Armonius Clementinus
