= Flavius Antoninus Messala Vivianus =

Roman politician

Flavius Antoninus Messala Vivianus (Greek: Βιβιανός; fl. 459–463) was an administrator of the Eastern Roman Empire.

== Biography ==
Vivianus was the father of Paulus (Consul in 512) and Adamantius. His full nomenclature is found on a monument from an uncertain province, indicating that he held the ranks of vir illustris and patricius, and that he had been praetorian prefect and consul ordinarius.

He was praetorian prefect of the East between 459 and 460. In 463 he was appointed Consul by the Eastern court, but he was not recognised in the West, where the only consul was Caecina Decius Basilius.

== Sources ==
- Martindale, John R., ed. (1980). "Fl. Vivianus 2". The Prosopography of the Later Roman Empire: Volume II, AD 395–527. Cambridge: Cambridge University Press. pp. 1179–1180. ISBN 0-521-20159-4.

Political offices
Preceded by Libius Severus Augustus; Leo Augustus II	Roman consul 463 with Caecina Decius Basilius	Succeeded by Rusticius; Anicius Olybrius
Preceded by Flavius Constantinus	Praetorian prefect of the East; 459–460	Succeeded by —
