= Moschianus (consul 512) =

Flavius Moschianus (Greek: Μοσχιανός; fl. 512) was a politician of the Eastern Roman Empire; he was appointed consul for 512.

== Life ==
Moschianus was a son of Sabinianus Magnus, magister militum per Illyricum (479-481), and the brother of Sabinianus, consul in 505. He married a niece of the emperor Anastasius I; their son Anastasius Paulus Probus Moschianus Probus Magnus was consul in 518.

Political offices
Preceded by Arcadius Placidus Magnus Felix; Flavius Secundinus	Consul of the Roman Empire; 512 with Paulus	Succeeded by Probus; Taurus Clementinus Armonius Clementinus
