= Photinus of Thessalonica =

Disciple of Acacius of Constantinople

Photinus (Greek: Φωτεινός, romanized: Phōteinós) of Thessalonica was a disciple of Acacius, Patriarch of Constantinople (471–489) and a deacon in the Church.

Pope Felix III (13 March 483–492) excommunicated Acacius for his heretical theories. Thus the foundation was laid for the Acacian Schism between the Eastern and Western Christian Churches.

Photinus was sent to Pope Anastasius II (496–498), probably by a supporter of Acacius, to plead his case. This Pope was, however, a moderate and tried to resolve the conflict by allowing the heretic deacon, who had been labelled an Acacian by his predecessor Pope Gelasius I, to partake in holy communion. This peace offering did not sway Photinus, but did result in suspicions among certain groups of Christians in the West about the views and opinions of Pope Anastasius.

Pope Anastasius died shortly after this visit in 498 and many Christians in the West perceived his death as a sign of God thus deepening the growing divide between the Western and Eastern Christian Churches even further, which resulted in an additional schism, the so-called Laurentian Schism.

== Literary reference ==
Photinus is mentioned in Dante's Inferno. Dante places Photinus with other heretics in the sixth ring of hell together with Pope Anastasius whom he supposedly led astray according to some Christians in the West. Some modern scholars are of the opinion that this is a case of mistaken identity and that Dante mistook Pope Anastasius for his contemporary, Emperor Anastasius (Emperor of Byzantium, 491–518).
