= Arcadius Placidus Magnus Felix =

Roman consul

Arcadius Placidus Magnus Felix (floruit 511) was a Roman politician who was appointed consul during the reign of Theodoric the Great.

He belonged to an ancient and noble family from Gaul; he lost his father in his youth, inheriting his wealth.

Theodoric bestowed on him at least one noteworthy office, as in 511 he was already vir illustris. That same year he was appointed consul in the West, while Secundinus was appointed consul by the Eastern court; the formal announcement was preserved by Cassiodorus (Variae, 2.1). Another letter to him from Theodoric has survived, which is assumed to have been written in the same year, asking him not to pay some debts claimed by the charioteers of the Hippodrome of Milan (Variae, 3.39).

== Notes ==
Political offices
Preceded by Boethius	Roman consul 511 with Secundinus	Succeeded by Paulus; Flavius Moschianus
