= Rufius Postumius Festus =

Roman aristocrat

Rufius Postumius Festus (fl. 472–507) was a Roman aristocrat who lived during the Late Roman Empire. Festus was the last consul appointed by an Emperor in the West. The next consul appointed in the West was Caecina Decius Maximus Basilius, whom king Odoacer appointed in 480, eight years after Festus.

== Life ==
His parentage is not recorded. Bagnall, et al., speculate that Festus' father may be the consul of 439 with the same name, but admit that beyond being "presumably a Roman aristocrat" nothing is known of the older Festus.

The year Festus was appointed consul (472), the emperor Anthemius was deposed by the powerful magister militum Ricimer after an armed struggle in the city of Rome that started at the beginning of the year, and ended with Anthemius' death on 11 July.

Festus survived this civil strife. He next appears in the historical record following the death of Pope Anastasius II. If Theodore Lector can be trusted, Festus had travelled to Constantinople where he secretly promised the Eastern emperor Zeno that Anastasius would approve the Henotikon; upon returning from Constantinople Festus discovered that Anastasius had died 19 November 498. By 22 November, Festus had picked Laurentius as a candidate for Anastasius' successor. Although arbitration by the Ostrogothic king Theoderic awarded the papal throne to Symmachus, Laurentius' supporters effectively ruled as pope until 506.

Between 507 and 511 Festus and Quintus Aurelius Memmius Symmachus brought a lawsuit against the ex-consul Paulinus at Rome, but the actual accusation is unknown.

Political offices
Preceded by Leo Augustus IV; Caelius Aconius Probianus	Roman consul 472 with Marcianus	Succeeded by Leo Augustus V
