= 487 =

Calendar year

487 in various calendars
Gregorian calendar	487; CDLXXXVII
Ab urbe condita	1240
Assyrian calendar	5237
Balinese saka calendar	408–409
Bengali calendar	−107 – −106
Berber calendar	1437
Buddhist calendar	1031
Burmese calendar	−151
Byzantine calendar	5995–5996
Chinese calendar	丙寅年 (Fire Tiger); 3184 or 2977 — to — 丁卯年 (Fire Rabbit); 3185 or 2978
Coptic calendar	203–204
Discordian calendar	1653
Ethiopian calendar	479–480
Hebrew calendar	4247–4248
- Hindu calendars
Vikram Samvat	543–544
Shaka Samvat	408–409
Kali Yuga	3587–3588
Holocene calendar	10487
Iranian calendar	135 BP – 134 BP
Islamic calendar	139 BH – 138 BH
Javanese calendar	373–374
Julian calendar	487; CDLXXXVII
Korean calendar	2820
Minguo calendar	1425 before ROC 民前1425年
Nanakshahi calendar	−981
Seleucid era	798/799 AG
Thai solar calendar	1029–1030
Tibetan calendar	མེ་ཕོ་སྟག་ལོ་ (male Fire-Tiger); 613 or 232 or −540 — to — མེ་མོ་ཡོས་ལོ་ (female Fire-Hare); 614 or 233 or −539

Year 487 (CDLXXXVII) was a common year starting on Thursday of the Julian calendar. At the time, it was known as the Year of the Consulship of Boethius without colleague (or, less frequently, year 1240 Ab urbe condita). The denomination 487 for this year has been used since the early medieval period, when the Anno Domini calendar era became the prevalent method in Europe for naming years.

== Events ==
=== By place ===
==== Europe ====
- King Odoacer leads an army to victory against the Rugians in Noricum (modern Austria).

==== Asia ====
- Emperor Kenzō of Japan, age 38, dies after a reign of only three years.

==== Central America ====
- July 28 – Bʼutz Aj Sak Chiik becomes the new ruler of the Mayan city-state of Palenque, in what is now the state of Chiapas in southern Mexico, and reigns until his death in 501.

=== By topic ===
==== Religion ====
- The Lateran Council, convened by Pope Felix III, establishes conditions for readmitting to the Church those Christians who have been rebaptized by the Vandals.

== Births ==
- Sacerdos of Lyon, French archbishop (d. 551)
- Theuderic I, king of the Franks (approximate date) (d. 534)
- Xiao Baoyin, prince of Southern Qi (d. 530)

== Deaths ==
- Gao Yun, duke of Northern Wei (b. 390)
- Kenzō, emperor of Japan (approximate date)
- Syagrius, "king of the Romans" (approximate date)
