= Theodorus (consul 505) =

Roman senator

Theodorus (fl. 505–523) was an Italian politician during the reign of Theodoric the Great. He held the consulship with Sabinianus as his colleague in 505.

Theodorus was son of Caecina Decius Maximus Basilius (consul in 480), and brother of Albinus (consul in 493), Avienus (consul in 501), and Inportunus (consul in 509).

While helping his brother Inportunus organize the games to celebrate Inportunus' consulate, the two of them were accused by the Greens of attacking them and killing one of their members. A surviving letter of Theodoric commands both of them to provide answers to these allegations before the tribunal of the inlustrius Caelianus and Agapitus.

John Moorhead identifies Theodorus as the recipient of a surviving letter from bishop Fulgentius of Ruspe, written in 520. While Fulgentius admits they do not know each other, he is writing Theodorus on account of a number of mutual friends, providing him a good deal of spiritual advice, and ends by asking Theodorus to pass his greetings to his mother and wife. "The letter," Moorhead notes, "providing as it does scarcely any concrete information about Theodorus, is doubtless chiefly of interest to the historian of spirituality, but it does enable us to locate Theodorus within another context, that of the circle of Fulgentius' correspondents."

In 523, he was part of the entourage of Pope John I, who had been ordered by King Theodoric to proceed to Constantinople and obtain a moderation of Emperor Justin's decree of 523 against the Arians. Theodoric threatened that if John should fail in his mission, there would be reprisals against the orthodox Catholics in the West. Other senators accompanying Pope John included his brother Inportunus, Agapitus, and the patrician Agapitus.

Political offices
Preceded by Rufius Petronius Nicomachus Cethegus	Roman consul 505 with Sabinianus	Succeeded by Ennodius Messala; Dagalaifus Areobindus
