= Areobindus Dagalaifus Areobindus =

Byzantine general and politician

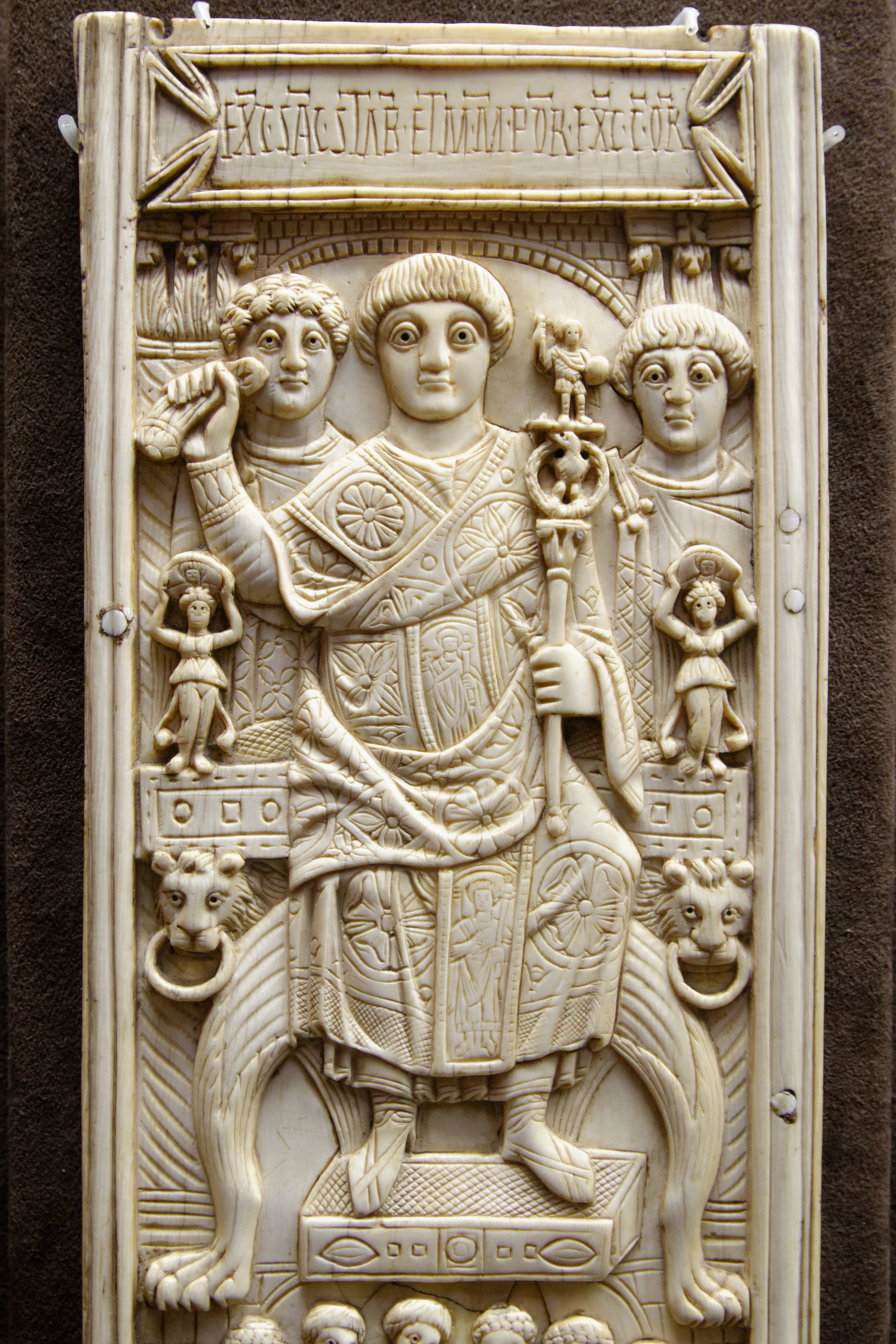
Areobindus in his consular robes, from his ivory consular diptych.

Flavius Areobindus Dagalaifus Areobindus (Ancient Greek: Ἀρεόβινδος; fl. 479–512) was an Eastern Roman general and politician. The scion of a distinguished line, he led troops in the Anastasian War, and served as consul in 506. During an urban riot in 512, Areobindus evaded a mob which wanted to force a change of government by proclaiming him emperor. He died soon after.

== Origins and family ==
Areobindus was born into an extremely distinguished family, which combined Roman and barbarian heritage: his father was Dagalaifus (c. 430 – after 461), consul in 461, who in turn was the son of Areobindus, consul in 434, both of Gothic origin. His mother was Godisthea (born c. 445), daughter of Ardabur, general and consul in 447, and granddaughter of Aspar, the powerful Alan general and consul in 434.

Shortly after 478, Areobindus married Anicia Juliana (after 461 – 527/528), daughter of the Western Roman emperor Olybrius and his wife Placidia. Together they had a son, Olybrius (c. 480 – after 524/527), consul in 491. Another possible descendant is Dagalaiphus (perhaps by an earlier wife).

== Career ==
In his consular diptychs, Areobindus is listed as having occupied the post of comes sacri stabuli (count of the imperial stable), and as having been accorded the title of an honorary consul. With the outbreak of the Anastasian War, he was sent to the East as magister militum per Orientem along with the praesental magistri Hypatius and Patricius. In May 503 Patricius and Hypatius besieged Amida with the bulk of the army, while Areobindus, at the head of 12,000 men, was based at Dara to keep watch on the Persian stronghold of Nisibis and the army of Shah Kavadh I. He repelled an attack by a Persian army coming from Singara and pushed them up to Nisibis. Eventually the Persians received reinforcements from their Hephthalite and Arab allies, and Areobindus was compelled to retreat, first to Constantia and then to Edessa. He was besieged there by Kavadh in September, but the onset of winter and the approach of Roman reinforcements forced the Persian ruler to withdraw. In the summer of 504, Areobindus launched a major raid into Arzanene, meeting little opposition and laying waste to large swaths of land before returning to Amida. With the Roman positions stabilized and the war now being carried over into Persian territory, Kavadh agreed to a truce and hostilities ceased in the winter. In 505 Areobindus was recalled to Constantinople, where he was awarded the consulship for 506, with Ennodius Messala as his colleague.

He was living in retirement at Constantinople in 512, at a time when the open advocation of miaphysite doctrines by Emperor Anastasius had caused great anger among the city's mostly Chalcedonian population. At one point, according to the chroniclers, the populace took up the cry "Areobindus for emperor" and marched to the house of his wife, Anicia Juliana, to proclaim him. Areobindus, however, unwilling to take part in a usurpation, had fled the house and gone into hiding. Nothing further is known of him, although, on account of his age, he must have died not long after.

== Diptychs ==
Five examples of his consular diptychs have survived: two complete and three half ones. The two complete ones are located in Lucca (CIL XI, 8137) and Zürich (CIL XIII, 5245); two halves with the name only are located at Paris and Besançon, and a further half with his titles is preserved at Dijon (CIL XIII, 10032, examples .3b, .3d and .3c respectively).

== Sources ==
- Bagnall, Roger S.; Alan Cameron; Seth R. Schwartz & Klaas A. Worp (1987). Consuls of the Later Roman Empire. Oxford University Press. ISBN 1-55540-099-X.
- Bury, John Bagnell (2016) [1958], History of the Later Roman Empire: From the Death of Theodosius I to the Death of Justinian, vol. 1, Dover Publications, ISBN 978-0-486-20398-0
- Greatrex, Geoffrey; Lieu, Samuel N. C. (2002), The Roman Eastern Frontier and the Persian Wars (Part II, 363–630 AD), Routledge, ISBN 0-415-14687-9
- Kazhdan, Alexander, ed. (1991). The Oxford Dictionary of Byzantium. Oxford and New York: Oxford University Press. ISBN 0-19-504652-8.
- Martindale, John R., ed. (1980). The Prosopography of the Later Roman Empire: Volume II, AD 395–527. Cambridge: Cambridge University Press. ISBN 0-521-20159-4.

| Preceded by Theodorus; Sabinian | Roman consul 506 with Ennodius Messala | Succeeded by Anastasius Augustus III; Venantius |
