= Caecina Decius Maximus Basilius =

Roman senator

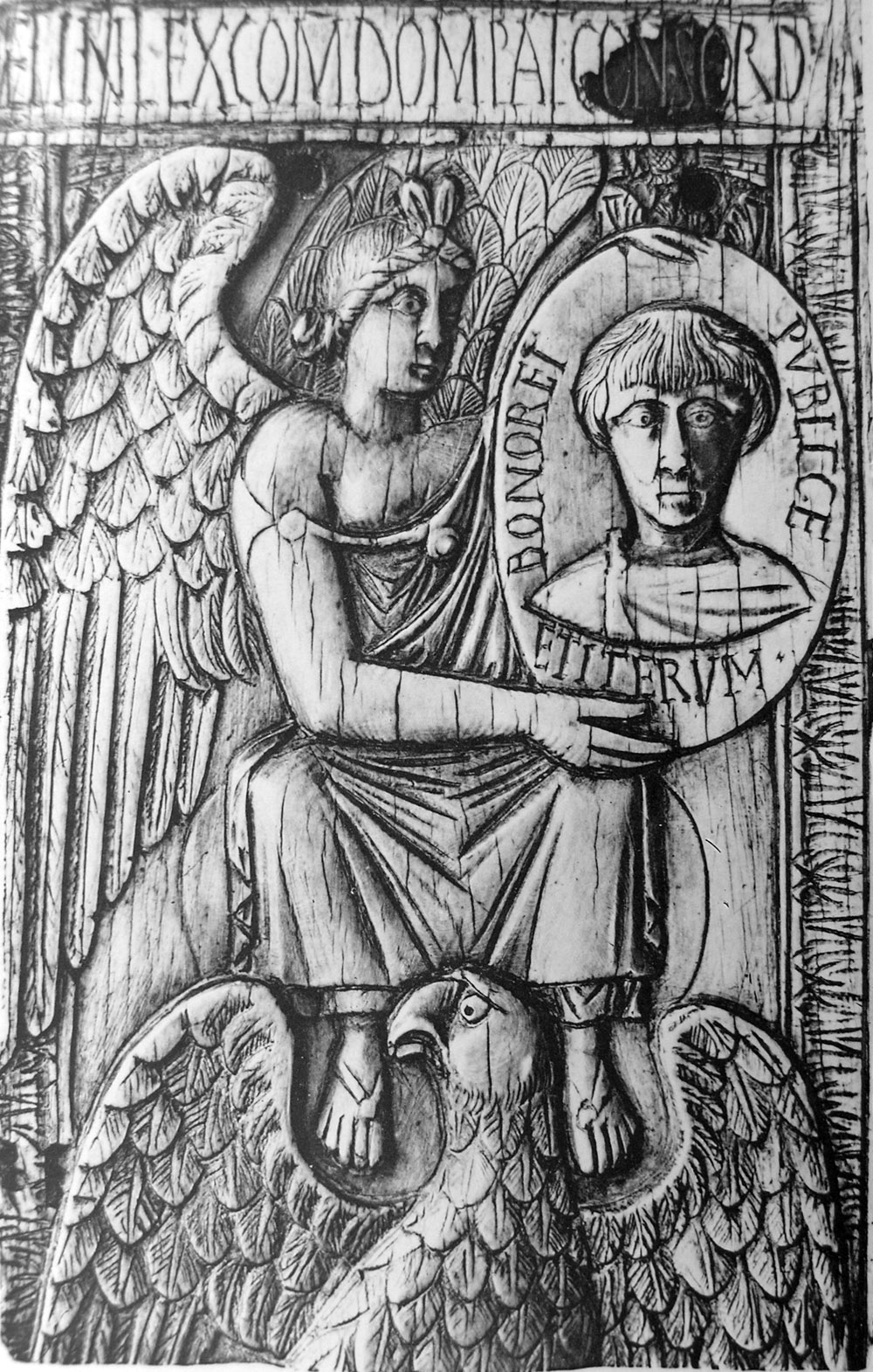
- Detail of consular diptych depicting Basilius
- Years active: fl. 480–483
- Office: Consul (480); Praetorian prefect of Italy (483)
- Political party: Greens
- Children: Albinus, Avienus, Inportunus, Theodorus

Caecina Decius Maximus Basilius (fl. 480–483), was a Roman politician. He was the first consul appointed under Odoacer's rule (480), and afterwards was Praetorian prefect of Italy. He is best known for presiding over the papal election of Pope Felix III.

== Life ==
A member of the gens Decia, Basilius was the son of Caecina Decius Basilius, one of the two consuls of 463. He had four sons, all of whom attained consular rank: Albinus in 493 (presumably the first consul nominated by Theodoric the Great), Avienus in 501, Theodorus in 505, and Inportunus in 509. He was the first consul appointed from Rome since Rufius Postumius Festus eight years before.

As leader of the Roman Senate and chief minister to king Odoacer, and patron to the Greens, Basilius was one of the most powerful men in post-Imperial Rome. As a result, Basilius played a major role in the papal election of 483, being the beneficiary of an admonitio issued by Pope Simplicius that gave him veto power over the election of Simplicius' successor. When it was clear Simplicius was on his deathbed, Basilius convened a meeting of the Senate, clergy, and leading local bishops to elect the next pope, Felix III. At the same council, an ecclesiastical law was promulgated which forbade the alienation of ecclesiastical property by future popes.

The date of Basilius' death is unknown, but the proceedings of a Roman synod of 501 indicate that he was dead by that date, and a passage of Cassiodorus shows that his death occurred before his sons reached adulthood, leaving their mother in charge of running the household.

Political offices
Preceded by Zeno Augustus III	Roman consul 480	Succeeded by Rufius Achilius Maecius Placidus
