= Anastasius (consul 517) =

Byzantine consul

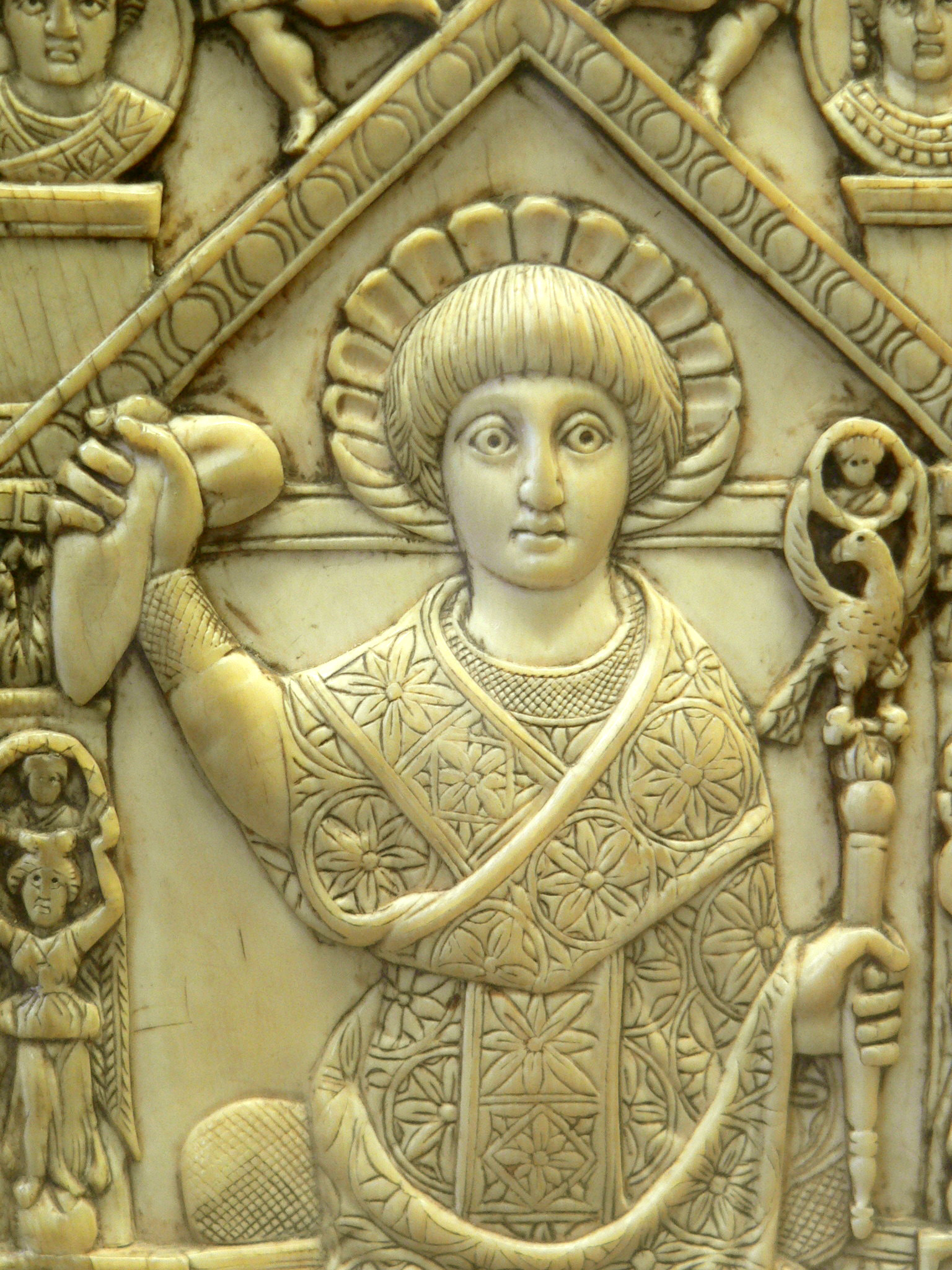
Anastasius wearing the robes and insignia of a Roman consul. In his left hand, he holds a staff with the aquila, and in his right, the cloth that was dropped to signal the start of the Hippodrome races.

Flavius Anastasius Paulus Probus Sabinianus Pompeius Anastasius (Greek: Άναστάσιος; fl. 517) was a politician of the Eastern Roman Empire.

== Life ==
Anastasius was the son of Sabinian, consul in 505, and of a niece of emperor Anastasius I, making him the emperor's grandnephew. He may have been the brother of Flavius Anastasius Paulus Probus Moschianus Probus Magnus, consul in 518. He was married to the Empress Theodora's illegitimate daughter, whose name has not survived. They had at least three children, John, Athenasius, and Anastasius, who was briefly married to Ioannina, the daughter of general Belisarius and Antonina.

He held the consulship for the year 517. His consular diptych is preserved at the Bibliothèque Nationale de France. According to the inscription (CIL V, 8120 CIL XIII, 10032) he held the honorary title of comes domesticorum equitum.

== Sources ==
- Croke, Brian (2001), Count Marcellinus and His Chronicle, Oxford University Press, p. 89.
- Martindale, John R., ed. (1980). "Fl. Anastasius Paulus Probus Sabinianus Pompeius Anastasius 17". The Prosopography of the Later Roman Empire: Volume II, AD 395–527. Cambridge: Cambridge University Press. pp. 82–83. ISBN 0-521-20159-4.

Political offices
Preceded by Petrus (alone)	Roman consul 517 with Agapitus	Succeeded by Anastasius Paulus Probus; Moschianus Probus Magnus (alone)
