= Antipope Dioscorus =

Deacon of the Alexandrian and the Roman church, antipope in 530

- Church: Alexandrian (before 506); Catholic (from 506)
- Elected: 22 September 530
- Papacy began: 22 September 530
- Papacy ended: 14 October 530
- Predecessor: Roman claimant : Felix IV; Boniface II; Antipapal claimant : Laurentius
- Successor: Roman claimant : Boniface II; Antipapal claimant : Theodore
- Opposed to: Pope Boniface II; Monophysitism; Theopaschism
- Other posts: Apocrisiarius to the Court of Justinian I; Deacon of the Catholic Church; Deacon of the Church of Alexandria

Personal details
- Died: 14 October 530

Dioscorus (died 14 October 530) was a deacon of the Alexandrian and the Roman church from 506. In a disputed election following the death of Pope Felix IV, the majority of electors picked him to be pope, in spite of Pope Felix's wishes that Boniface II should succeed him. However, Dioscorus died less than a month after the election, allowing Boniface to be consecrated pope and Dioscorus to be branded an antipope.

== Deaconry ==
Originally a deacon of the Church of Alexandria, Dioscorus was forced to flee as an opponent of Miaphysitism, arriving in Rome around 506 during the Laurentian schism. There, he was adopted into the ranks of the Roman clergy, and soon acquired considerable influence in the Church of Rome. Jeffrey Richards credits him with persuading king Theodoric the Great to recognize Symmachus as the rightful pope. Later, under Pope Hormisdas, he served as papal apocrisiarius, or legate, to the court of Emperor Justinian I at Constantinople, ending the Acacian schism, and was instrumental in persuading Hormisdas to reject Theopaschism. During the pontificate of Felix IV he became the recognized head of the pro-Byzantine party.

== Papal selection ==
Pope Felix IV wished Boniface to succeed him, partially to avoid the riots that had occurred on his own accession. Further, Richards describes him as being part of the pro-Gothic party of clergy, bishops and aristocrats, and his "principal concern, however, was to ensure that the pro-Gothic party remained in control of the papacy." During the sixth century a tradition had evolved where popes would informally nominate their successors, but Felix went even further and issued a praeceptum formally nominating Boniface, and on his sickbed gave his pallium to him, on the condition that should Felix recover Boniface would return it. However, the Senate was outraged that it had been preempted from the process, and issued an edict forbidding anyone from accepting the nomination or discussing it during Pope Felix's life, on pain of exile and confiscation of property. Richards notes that the clergy did not voice a similar outrage, "perhaps because the majority of the clergy agreed on this occasion with the senate in censuring the action of Pope Felix".

When the election was held in the Lateran Palace on 22 September 530 following the death of Felix, a majority of the electors voted for Dioscorus; Richards concludes at least 60 of the Roman priests supported Dioscorus, based on their subsequent act of submission. Boniface's supporters retreated to the Basilica Julia, where they elected Boniface. Dioscorus was later recognized as pope by the East. Although his prospects for his consecration looked dark, the dispute was resolved when Dioscorus died three weeks later on 14 October. The pro-Byzantine faction was left leaderless; Felix's wishes were acceded to with his chosen candidate becoming Boniface II.

== Legacy ==
According to the Liber Pontificalis, Boniface forced the clergy who had nominated Dioscorus to sign a retraction and condemn his memory. This document was later destroyed, although the Liber Pontificalis contains contradictory accounts: in one passage, Pope Agapetus I burned the document in front of an audience at the beginning of his tenure, while in another, it was Boniface himself who burned the document.
