= Pope Felix IV =

Head of the Catholic Church from 526 to 530

Pope Saint Felix IV
- Bishop of Rome
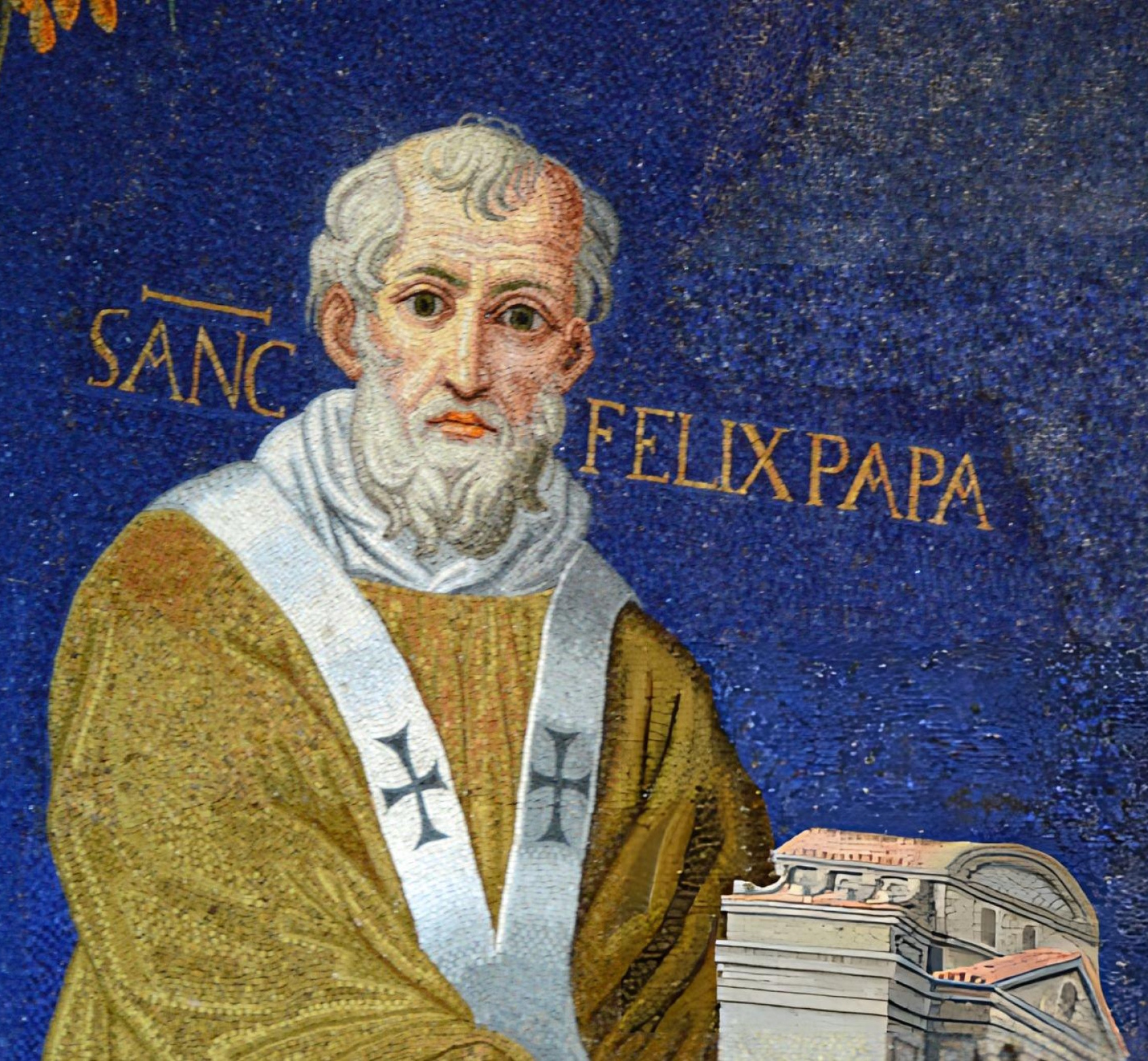
- Restored mosaic of Felix IV in the Basilica of Santi Cosma e Damiano, Rome
- Church: Catholic Church
- Papacy began: 12 July 526
- Papacy ended: 22 September 530
- Predecessor: John I
- Successor: Boniface II

Personal details
- Born: c. 489–490 Samnium, Odoacer's Kingdom of Italy
- Died: 22 September 530 (aged 40) Rome, Ostrogothic Kingdom

Sainthood
- Feast day: 30 January

Pope Felix IV (489/490 – 22 September 530) was the bishop of Rome from 12 July 526 to his death on 22 September 530. He was the chosen candidate of Ostrogoth King Theodoric the Great, who had imprisoned Felix's predecessor, John I.

== Rise ==
Felix came from Samnium, the son of Castorius. He was elected after a gap of nearly two months after the death of John I, who had died in prison in Ravenna, having completed a diplomatic mission to Constantinople on behalf of the Ostrogoth King Theodoric the Great. The papal electors acceded to the king's demands and chose Felix as pope. Felix's favor in the eyes of the king allowed him to press for greater benefits for the church. However, Theodoric died later that year, allowing Felix to pursue his own policies in peace.

== Pontificate ==
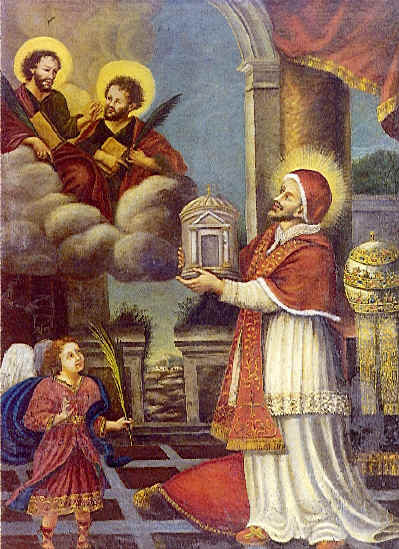
Painting showing Felix IV presenting their church to Cosmas and Damian.

Felix built the Santi Cosma e Damiano in the Imperial forums on land donated by Queen Amalasuntha, and consecrated no fewer than thirty-nine bishops, during his short tenure of four years. During Felix's pontificate, an imperial edict was passed granting that cases against clergy should be dealt with by the pope or a designated ecclesiastical court. Violation of this ruling would result in a fine, the proceeds of which were designated for the poor. Felix also defined church teaching on grace and free will in response to a request of Faustus of Riez, in Gaul, on opposing Semi-Pelagianism. As such, Felix approved the teachings of the Council of Orange in 529, which also explained original sin.

Felix attempted to designate his own successor: Pope Boniface II. The reaction of the Senate was to forbid the discussion of a pope's successor during his lifetime or to accept such a nomination. The majority of the clergy reacted to Felix's activity by nominating Dioscorus as Pope. Only a minority supported Boniface. His feast day is celebrated on 30 January. He remains the most recent pope to bear the pontifical name "Felix". (Note: The last antipope, Felix V, took the name "Felix" in 1439.)

== Notes ==
Catholic Church titles
Preceded by John I	Pope; 526–530	Succeeded by Boniface II
