= Sabinian (proconsul) =

Usurper of the Roman Empire (240)

Roman emperor
- Reign: 240
- Predecessor: Gordian III
- Successor: Gordian III
Names
- Marcus Asinius Sabinianus
Regnal name
- Imperator Caesar Sabinianus Augustus

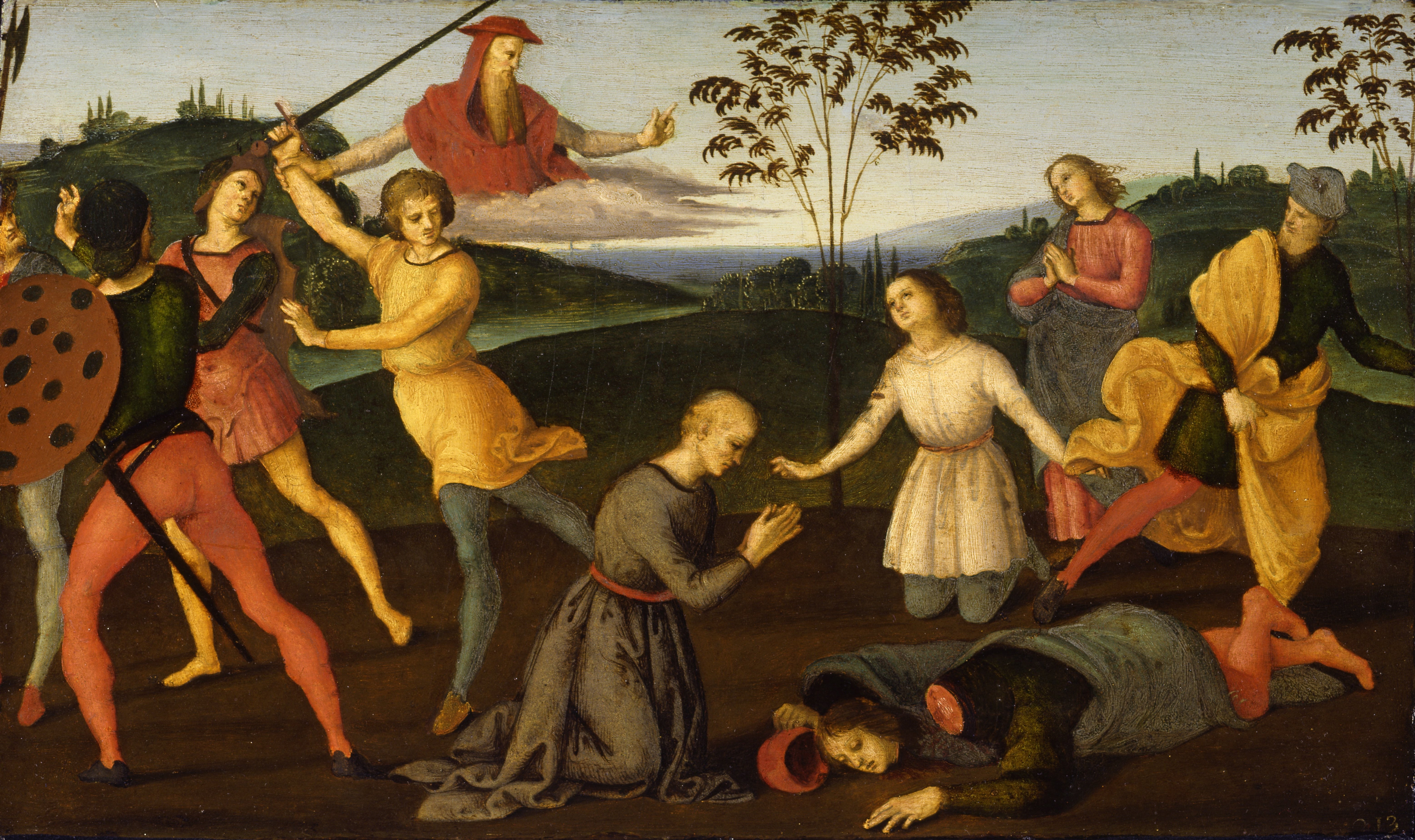
St. Jerome Punishing the Heretic Sabinian by Raphael, c. 1502–1503

Marcus Asinius Sabinianus or Sabinian was proconsul of the Roman province of Africa. In 240 he led a revolt against Gordian III. He proclaimed himself emperor, but after being defeated by the governor of Mauretania, his supporters in Carthage surrendered him to the imperial authorities.
