= Pope Boniface II =

Head of the Catholic Church from 530 to 532

- Bishop of Rome
- Church: Catholic Church
- Papacy began: 22 September 530
- Papacy ended: 17 October 532
- Predecessor: Felix IV
- Successor: John II

Personal details
- Born: Rome?, Kingdom of Odoacer
- Died: 17 October 532 Rome, Ostrogothic Kingdom

Pope Boniface II (Latin: Bonifatius II; died 17 October 532) was the first Germanic Bishop of Rome. He ruled the Holy See from 22 September 530 until his death on 17 October 532. Boniface died of natural causes, likely an illness or old age.

== Early life ==
Boniface's father's name was Sigibuld. He was probably born in Rome, and was designated to succeed to the papacy by his predecessor, Felix IV, who had been a strong adherent of the Arian Kings of Ostrogoths.

== Papacy ==
Boniface was later elected, largely due to the influence of Athalaric, King of Ostrogoths. For a time, he served as pope in competition with Dioscorus, who had been elected by most of the priests of Rome. Boniface and Dioscorus were both consecrated in Rome on 22 September 530, but Dioscurus died only twenty-two days later.

Boniface II's most notable act was confirming the decisions of the Council of Orange, teaching that grace is always necessary to obtain salvation.

== Death ==
Boniface died on 17 October 532. His body was buried in St. Peter's Basilica in Rome.

== Sources ==
- Sessa, Kristina (2012). The Formation of Papal Authority in Late Antique Italy: Roman Bishops and the Domestic Sphere. Cambridge University Press.

Catholic Church titles
Preceded by Felix IV	Pope; 530–532	Succeeded by John II
