= Secundinus (consul 511) =

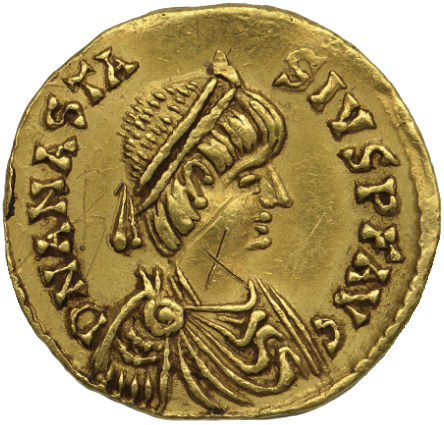
Flavius Secundinus on a coin

Flavius Secundinus was a politician and statesman of the Eastern Roman Empire in the sixth century AD.

== Family ==
He married Caesaria, the sister of Emperor Anastasius I. Their sons were Flavius Hypatius, consul in 500 AD, and reluctant usurper during the Nika Riots, and Flavius Pompeius, consul of 501 AD.

== Career ==
In 492 AD, Secundinus served as Urban Prefect of Constantinople. In 503 AD, he was awarded the honorific title of Patrikios for his connection to the emperor. In 511 AD, he served as consul together with Arcadius Placidus Magnus Felix as his colleague in the West.

In 515 AD, the emperor sent Hypatius with an army against the rebel Vitalian, failing and being captured. Secundinus then ransomed his son.
