= Sabinianus Magnus =

General of the Eastern Roman Empire

Sabinianus Magnus (Greek: Σαβινιανός ό Μέγας; died 481) was a general of the Eastern Roman Empire, who fought in the rebellion of Theodoric Strabo against Emperor Zeno.

== Biography ==
Much of the biography of Sabinianus Magnus is known through the Chronicle of Marcellinus Comes, who presents a favorable view. Like Marcellinus, he was one of the Illyrians who were part of the imperial administration and army in the 5th century. The stance of Marcellinus stance towards Sabinianus has been described as reflecting a "clear Illyrian bias". Marcellinus may have held positive view towards Sabinianus because of a personal or familial relationship. His stance may also echo the opinion of the Illyrian community of veterans and refugees in the imperial capital.

In 479, in Edessa, he received the codicils with his appointment to the rank of Magister militum per Illyricum from the hands of the patricius Adamantius, succeeding to Onoulphus.

At that time, the Eastern Emperor Zeno had to manage the revolt of his former general, the Ostrogoth chieftain Theodoric Strabo, who did not recognise Zeno's succession in 474. He hampered the negotiations between Theodoric and Adamantius, refusing to swear that the hostages exchanged would be safe from harm, officially for religious reasons, but actually because he opposed the reconciliation policy with the Goths. In fact, as the negotiations went on, he decided to attack the Goths: moving with his army at the back of the enemy, he succeeded in killing many of them and in capturing a great part of their baggages. Once he had returned to Lychnidus, he obtained the support of the Praetorian prefect of Illyricum, Iohannes and successfully suggested the Emperor to reject the truce signed with Theodoric and to keep fighting him.

Sabinianus' presence in Illyricum along with the Gothic soldier Gento, prevented Theodoric from pillaging that territory (479), but later he fell out of favour at court, and Emperor Zeno executed him.

Sabinianus was the father of Sabinianus, who held the office of Consul in 505. The 6th-century historian Marcellinus Comes states that he was a severe commander, but a true defender of the Roman State. The entry about Marcellinus ends with the description that Sabinianus Magnus died "before he could bring fresh help to the exhausted empire".

== Bibliography ==
- Croke, Brian; Marcellin, Ammien (2001). Count Marcellinus and his chronicle. Oxford University Press. ISBN 0198150016.
- Martindale, John R., ed. (1980). "Sabinianus Magnus 4". The Prosopography of the Later Roman Empire: Volume II, AD 395–527. Cambridge: Cambridge University Press. p. 967. ISBN 0-521-20159-4.
