= Antipope Laurentius =

5/6th-century antipope

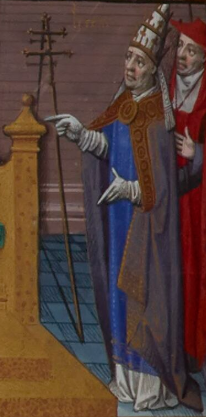
- Miniature of Laurentius, c. 1260
- Papacy began: 22 November 498
- Papacy ended: 506
- Predecessor: as Pope: Anastasius II as Antipope: Eulalius
- Successor: as Pope: Symmachus as Antipope: Dioscorus
- Opposed to: Pope Symmachus

Personal details
- Died: Rome, Italy

Laurentius (possibly Caelius) was the Archpriest of Santa Prassede and later antipope of the See of Rome. Elected in 498 at the Basilica Saint Mariae (presumably Saint Maria Maggiore) with the support of a dissenting faction with Byzantine sympathies, who were supported by Eastern Roman Emperor Anastasius I Dicorus, in opposition to Pope Symmachus, the division between the two opposing factions split not only the church, but the Senate and the people of Rome. However, Laurentius remained in Rome as pope until 506.

== Biography ==
Archpriest of Santa Prassede, Laurentius was elected pope on 22 November 498, in opposition to Pope Symmachus, by a dissenting faction. If Theodore Lector can be trusted, he was picked by the former consul Rufius Postumius Festus as a candidate; Festus had secretly promised the Byzantine Emperor Anastasius that Pope Anastasius II would approve the Henotikon, but upon returning from Constantinople he found the Pope had died.

The groups supporting Laurentius and Symmachus split the clergy, Roman Senate and common people, leading to violent clashes between rival groups of supporters. It was clear that some form of arbitration was needed, and both groups proceeded to Ravenna to present their arguments to king Theoderic the Great of the Ostrogoths. Jeffrey Richards observes that "it is a remarkable state of affairs when an Arian king has, for whatever reason, to choose a Catholic pope." Theodoric reviewed the facts, and found that Symmachus fulfilled his criteria for being duly consecrated pope. The "Laurentian Fragment", a document written by partisans of Laurentius, asserts that Symmachus obtained the decision by paying bribes, while deacon Magnus Felix Ennodius of Milan later wrote that 400 solidi were distributed amongst influential personages, whom it would be indiscreet to name.

Finding himself victorious, Symmachus proceeded to call a synod held at Rome on 1 March 499, which was attended by 72 bishops and all of the Roman clergy, with the aim of confirming that his congregation accepted the king's judgment, as well as ensuring in the future there would be no rioting or illegal canvassing at election time. He also tried to appease his opposition by offering Laurentius the Diocese of Nuceria, in Campania. According to the account in the Liber Pontificalis, Symmachus bestowed the see on Laurentius "guided by sympathy", but the "Laurentian Fragment" states that Laurentius "was severely threatened and cajoled, and forcibly despatched" to Nuceria. In either case, the subscription of Aprilis, bishop of Nuceria, to the acta of the synod of 502 suggests Laurentius either never took up the see, or was deposed from it soon after.

However, Laurentius' supporters sustained the schism. Led by Festus, a group of clerics and senators laid charges against Symmachus in an attempt to secure his deposition. Theodoric summoned Symmachus to Ariminum to answer these charges, but after arriving, Symmachus fled the city in the middle of the night, returning to Rome, where he took refuge in St. Peter's. His flight proved to be a major mistake, for it was widely seen as an admission of guilt. Many of the clergy withdrew from communion with Symmachus, and entered into communion with Laurentius.

A contentious synod held in 502 failed to resolve the schism. Laurentius returned to Rome later that year, and for the following four years, according to the "Laurentian Fragment", he held its churches and ruled as pope, with the support of Festus. Laurentius was only forced from his position when a diplomatic effort to convince Theodoric to intervene succeeded. Conducted chiefly by two non-Roman supporters, the Milanese deacon Ennodius and the exiled deacon Dioscorus, they convinced the king's personal physician, the deacon Helpidius, and then convinced Theodoric to instruct Festus to hand over the Roman churches to Symmachus.

Once news of Theodoric's decision reached Rome, Laurentius retired from the city to one of Festus's estates, according to the "Laurentian Fragment", because "he did not want the city to be troubled by daily strife", where he fasted constantly until his death.

== See also ==
- Papal selection before 1059
