= Sabinianus (consul 505) =

6th-century Eastern Roman consul

Sabinianus (Greek: Σαβινιανός; floruit 505–508) was a politician and a general of the Eastern Roman Empire.

== Life ==
Sabinian was the son of Sabinianus Magnus, a magister militum per Illyricum (479–481). He married a niece of emperor Anastasius I and was the father of Anastasius Paulus Probus Sabinianus Pompeius Anastasius, consul in 517.

In 505 he held the consulship, while in 508 he was appointed magister militum per Illyricum. He had a big and well-equipped army, but near Horreum Margi he was defeated by the combined armies of the Huns, led by Mundo, and of the Ostrogoths, led by Pitzias. After the defeat, he went with a few survivors to the fortress of Natus.

== Bibliography ==
- Croke, Brian, Count Marcellinus and His Chronicle, Oxford University Press, 2001, ISBN 0-19-815001-6, p. 89.
- Martindale, John R., ed. (1980). The Prosopography of the Later Roman Empire: Volume II, AD 395–527. Cambridge: Cambridge University Press. pp. 967–968. ISBN 0-521-20159-4.

Political offices
Preceded by Rufius Petronius Nicomachus Cethegus	Roman consul 505 with Theodorus	Succeeded by Ennodius Messala; Dagalaifus Areobindus
