= Magnus Felix Ennodius =

Bishop of Pavia

Saint Magnus Felix Ennodius
- Born: 473 or 474; Arles, Western Roman Empire
- Died: 17 July 521
- Venerated in: Catholic Church, Eastern Orthodox Church
- Feast: 17 July

Magnus Felix Ennodius (473 or 474 – 17 July 521 AD) was Bishop of Pavia in 514, and a Latin rhetorician and poet.

He was one of four Gallo-Roman aristocrats of the fifth to sixth-century whose letters survive in quantity: the others are Sidonius Apollinaris, prefect of Rome in 468 and bishop of Clermont (died 485), Ruricius, bishop of Limoges (died 507) and Alcimus Ecdicius Avitus, bishop of Vienne (died 518). All of them were linked in the tightly bound aristocratic Gallo-Roman network that provided the bishops of Catholic Gaul. He is regarded as a saint, with a feast day of 17 July.

== Life ==
Ennodius was born at Arelate (Arles) and belonged to a distinguished but impecunious family. As Mommaerts and Kelley observe, "Ennodius claimed in his letters to them to be related to a large number of individuals. Unfortunately, he seldom specified the nature of the relationship." Because his sister Euprepia (born 465 or 470) is known to have had a son named Flavius Licerius Firminus Lupicinus, who was named for his grandfather, Vogel argued that Ennodius's father was named Firminus. Jacques Sirmond suggested that Ennodius was the son of one Camillus of Arles, whose father was a proconsular and the brother of Magnus, the consul of 460; but Mommaerts and Kelley dismiss Sirmond's identification as untenable.

Having lost his parents at an early age, Ennodius was brought up by an aunt at Ticinum (Pavia); according to some, at Mediolanum (Milan). After her death he was received into the family of a pious and wealthy young lady, to whom he was betrothed. It is not certain whether he actually married this lady; she seems to have lost her money and retired to a convent, whereupon Ennodius entered the Church, and was ordained deacon (about 493) by Epiphanius, bishop of Pavia.

From Pavia he went to Milan, which Ennodius made his home until his elevation to the see of Pavia about 515. During his stay at Milan he visited Rome and other places, where he gained a reputation as a teacher of rhetoric. As bishop of Pavia he played a considerable part in ecclesiastical affairs. On two occasions (in 515 and 517) he was sent to Constantinople on an embassy to the emperor Anastasius, to endeavour to bring about a reconciliation over the Acacian schism that divided the Eastern and Western churches. Ennodius's epitaph still exists in the basilica of San Michele Maggiore, Pavia.

== Writings ==
Ennodius is one of the best representatives of the two-fold (pagan and Christian) tendency of 5th century literature, and of the Gallo-Roman clergy who upheld the cause of civilization and classical literature against the inroads of barbarism. But his anxiety not to fall behind his classical models—the chief of whom was Virgil—his striving after elegance and grammatical correctness, and a desire to avoid the commonplace have produced a turgid and affected style, which, aggravated by rhetorical exaggerations and popular barbarisms, makes his works difficult to understand. It has been remarked that his poetry is less unintelligible than his prose.

The numerous writings of this ecclesiastic may be grouped into four types: letters, miscellanies, discourses, and poems. His letters on a variety of subjects, addressed to high church and state officials, are valuable for the religious and political history of the period. Of the miscellanies, the most important are:

- The Panegyric of Theodoric, written to thank the Arian king for his tolerance of Catholicism and support of Pope Symmachus (probably delivered before the king on the occasion of his entry into Ravenna or Milan); like all similar works, it is full of flattery and exaggeration, but if used with caution is a valuable authority.
- The Life of St Epiphanius, bishop of Pavia, the best written and perhaps the most important of all his writings, an interesting picture of the political activity and influence of the church
- Eucharisticon de Vita Sua, a sort of confessions, after the manner of Augustine of Hippo
- the description of the enfranchisement of a slave with religious formalities in the presence of a bishop
- Paraenesis didascalica, an educational guide, in which the claims of grammar as a preparation for the study of rhetoric, the mother of all the sciences, are strongly insisted on.

The discourses (Dictiones) are on sacred, scholastic, controversial and ethical subjects. The discourse on the anniversary of Laurentius, bishop of Milan, is the chief authority for the life of that prelate; the scholastic discourses, rhetorical exercises for the schools, contain eulogies of classical learning, distinguished professors and pupils; the controversial deal with imaginary charges, the subjects being chiefly borrowed from the Controversiae of Seneca the Elder; the ethical harangues are put into the mouth of mythological personages (e.g. the speech of Thetis over the body of Achilles).

His poems include:

- two Itineraria, descriptions of a journey from Milan to Brigantium (Briançon) and of a trip on the Po River
- a defense of the study of secular literature
- an epithalamium, in which Love is introduced as execrating Christianity
- a dozen hymns, after the manner of Ambrose, probably intended for church use
- epigrams on various subjects, some being epigrams proper (inscriptions for tombs, basilicas, baptisteries) and others imitations of Martial, satiric pieces and descriptions of scenery.

== Critical editions ==
The editio princeps of Ennodius was published by Johann Jakob Grynaeus in 1569 at Basel. Sirmond edited his works in 1611, organizing the individual works into the four groupings described above; this presentation remained "the classic text" until Guilelmus Hartel (vol. vi. of Corpus Scriptorum Ecclesiasticorum Latinorum, Vienna, 1882). However, it was not until 1885 that Friedrich Vogel prepared an edition for the Monumenta Germaniae Historica (Auctores Antiquissimi, vol. vii), that the individual works were once again presented in the miscellaneous order of the manuscripts. Vogel did so seeing traces of a chronological sequence in that order, which Sr. Genevieve Cook notes led to "a series of studies on the chronology of the works of Ennodius".

A modern edition of Ennodius's correspondence is under way: Stéphane Gioanni, Ennode de Pavie, Lettres, tome I: Livres I et II, Paris, Les Belles Lettres, 2006, based on his 2004 Ph.D. thesis. See a first review (Joop van Waarden) and Stéphane Gioanni, Ennode de Pavie, Lettres, tome II, livres III et IV, Paris, Les Belles Lettres, 2010.
