= Caecinia gens =

Etruscan and Roman family

The gens Caecinia was a plebeian family of Etruscan origin at ancient Rome. Members of this gens are first mentioned in the time of Cicero, and they remained prominent through the first century of the Empire, before fading into obscurity in the time of the Flavian emperors. A family of this name rose to prominence once more at the beginning of the fifth century.

== Origin ==
The Etruscan roots of the Caecinae are indicated by the form of their nomen, which in the masculine form ends in -na, typical of Etruscan names. The feminine form, Caecinia, is formed as though the masculine form were Caecinius, which is also encountered, though rarely, in inscriptions. The Caecinae seem either to have derived their name from, or given it to, the river Caecina, which flows by the town of Volaterrae, one of the ancient cities of Etruria. A sepulchre belonging to the Caecinae has been discovered near Volaterrae; a beautiful sarcophagus, now in the Museum of Paris, was found inside. The poet Caecina had a villa in the same neighbourhood, and families of the name have resided at modern Volterra until the present day. From the tomb of the Caecinae, we learn that Ceicna was the Etruscan form of the name.

== Praenomina ==
The chief praenomina of the Caecinae were Aulus, Gaius, and Lucius, all of which were common throughout Roman history. Other common praenomina are occasionally found, including Quintus, Publius, and Sextus.

== Branches and cognomina ==
The family was divided into several branches, and we accordingly find on the funeral urns the cognomina Caspu and Tlapuni; in Latin inscriptions we also meet with the surnames Quadratus and Placidus, and various others occur.

== Members ==
This list includes abbreviated praenomina. For an explanation of this practice, see filiation.

- Aulus Caecina, a native of Volaterrae, whom Cicero defended in his oration, Pro Caecina, in 69 BC.
- Aulus Caecina A. f. Severus, an orator and scholar of Etruscan culture. He was a political opponent of Caesar, but was pardoned at the end of the Civil War. He was the author of a work on Etruscan religious practices, which was an important source of information for Pliny the Elder and Seneca the Younger.
- Caecina, a native of Volaterrae, and friend of Octavian.
- Aulus Caecina Severus, suffect consul in 1 BC and legate of Germanicus, triumphed over the Cherusci in AD 14.
- Gaius Caecina Largus, consul suffectus in AD 13.
- Aulus Caecina Paetus, consul suffectus in AD 37; put to death by the emperor Claudius in AD 42.
- Gaius Caecina Largus, consul in AD 42, close friend of Claudius, inhabited the magnificent house which formerly belonged to Marcus Aemilius Scaurus, a contemporary of Cicero.
- Quintus Caecina Primus, consul suffectus in AD 53, probably in the middle of the year.
- Gaius Caecina Tuscus, governor of Egypt, was banished by the emperor Nero.
- Aulus Caecina Alienus, one of Vitellius' generals in AD 69.
- Licinius Caecina, a senator attached to Otho's party, in AD 69.
- Gaius Laecanius Bassus Caecina Paetus, consul suffectus for the months of November and December in AD 70, and subsequently governor of Asia.
- Gaius Caecina Largus, governor of Thracia c. AD 198.
- Caecina Largus, praefectus annonae c. AD 250.
- Aulus Caecina Tacitus, governor of Hispania Baetica, and consul, possibly ordinary consul in 273.
- Antonius Caecina Sabinus, consul in AD 316.
- Caecinia Lolliana, a priestess of Isis, and the wife of Gaius Ceionius Rufius Volusianus Lampadius.
- Publilius Ceionius Caecina Albinus, presumably the son of Lampadius and Lolliana, was governor of Numidia between 364 and 367.
- Caecina Decius Albinus, son of Publilius, was praefectus urbi of Rome in AD 402.
- Caecina Decius Aginatius Albinus, praefectus urbi of Rome in AD 414.
- Albinus, praefectus urbi of Rome in AD 426, consul in 444, and praetorian prefect of Italy from 443 to 449. Possibly identical to Aginatius Albinus.
- Caecina Decius Basilius, consul in 463 and twice praetorian prefect of Italy.
- Caecina Decius Maximus Basilius, consul in AD 480 and praetorian prefect of Italy in 483.
- Caecina Mavortius Basilius Decius, consul in AD 486.
- Caecina Decius Faustus Albinus, son of Maximus Basilius, was consul in 493 and praetorian prefect of Italy around 500.

== See also ==
- List of Roman gentes

== Bibliography ==
- Marcus Tullius Cicero, Epistulae ad Atticum, Epistulae ad Familiares, Pro Caecina.
- Aulus Hirtius (attributed), De Bello Africo (On the African War).
- Marcus Velleius Paterculus, Compendium of Roman History.
- Quintus Asconius Pedianus, Commentarius in Oratio Ciceronis Pro Scauro (Commentary on Cicero's Oration Pro Scauro).
- Lucius Annaeus Seneca (Seneca the Younger), Naturales Quaestiones (Natural Questions).
- Gaius Plinius Secundus (Pliny the Elder), Historia Naturalis (Natural History).
- Gaius Plinius Caecilius Secundus (Pliny the Younger), Epistulae (Letters).
- Flavius Josephus, Bellum Judaïcum (The Jewish War).
- Marcus Valerius Martialis (Martial), Epigrammata (Epigrams).
- Publius Cornelius Tacitus, Annales, Historiae.
- Gaius Suetonius Tranquillus, De Vita Caesarum (Lives of the Caesars, or The Twelve Caesars).
- Appianus Alexandrinus (Appian), Bellum Civile (The Civil War).
- Cassius Dio, Roman History.
- Sextus Aurelius Victor (attributed), Epitome de Caesaribus.
- Joannes Zonaras, Epitome Historiarum (Epitome of History).
- Dictionary of Greek and Roman Biography and Mythology, William Smith, ed., Little, Brown and Company, Boston (1849).
- Theodor Mommsen et alii, Corpus Inscriptionum Latinarum (The Body of Latin Inscriptions, abbreviated CIL), Berlin-Brandenburgische Akademie der Wissenschaften (1853–present).
- René Cagnat et alii, L'Année épigraphique (The Year in Epigraphy, abbreviated AE), Presses Universitaires de France (1888–present).
- George Davis Chase, "The Origin of Roman Praenomina", in Harvard Studies in Classical Philology, vol. VIII, pp. 103–184 (1897).
- Arthur E. and Joyce S. Gordon, "Roman Names and the Consuls of A. D. 13", in American Journal of Philology, vol. 72, pp. 283–292, (1951).
- Paul A. Gallivan, "The Fasti for the Reign of Claudius", in Classical Quarterly, vol. 28, pp. 407–426 (1978); "The Fasti for A.D. 70–96", in Classical Quarterly, vol. 31, pp. 186–220 (1981).
- Werner Eck, "Jahres- und Provinzialfasten der senatorischen Statthalter von 69/70 bis 138/139" (Annual and Provincial Fasti of the Senatorial Governors from AD 69/70 to 138/139), in Chiron, vol. 12 (1982).
- Paul M. M. Leunissen, Konsuln und Konsulare in der Zeit von Commodus bis Severus Alexander (Consuls and Consulars from the Time of Commodus to Severus Alexander), Verlag Gieben, Amsterdam, (1989).
- Olli Salomies, Adoptive and Polyonymous Nomenclature in the Roman Empire, Societas Scientiarum Fennica, Helsinki (1992).
- Martindale, John R.; Jones, A. H. M.; Morris, John, eds. (1971). The Prosopography of the Later Roman Empire: Volume I, AD 260–395. Cambridge: Cambridge University Press. ISBN 0-521-07233-6.
