= Manlius Boethius =

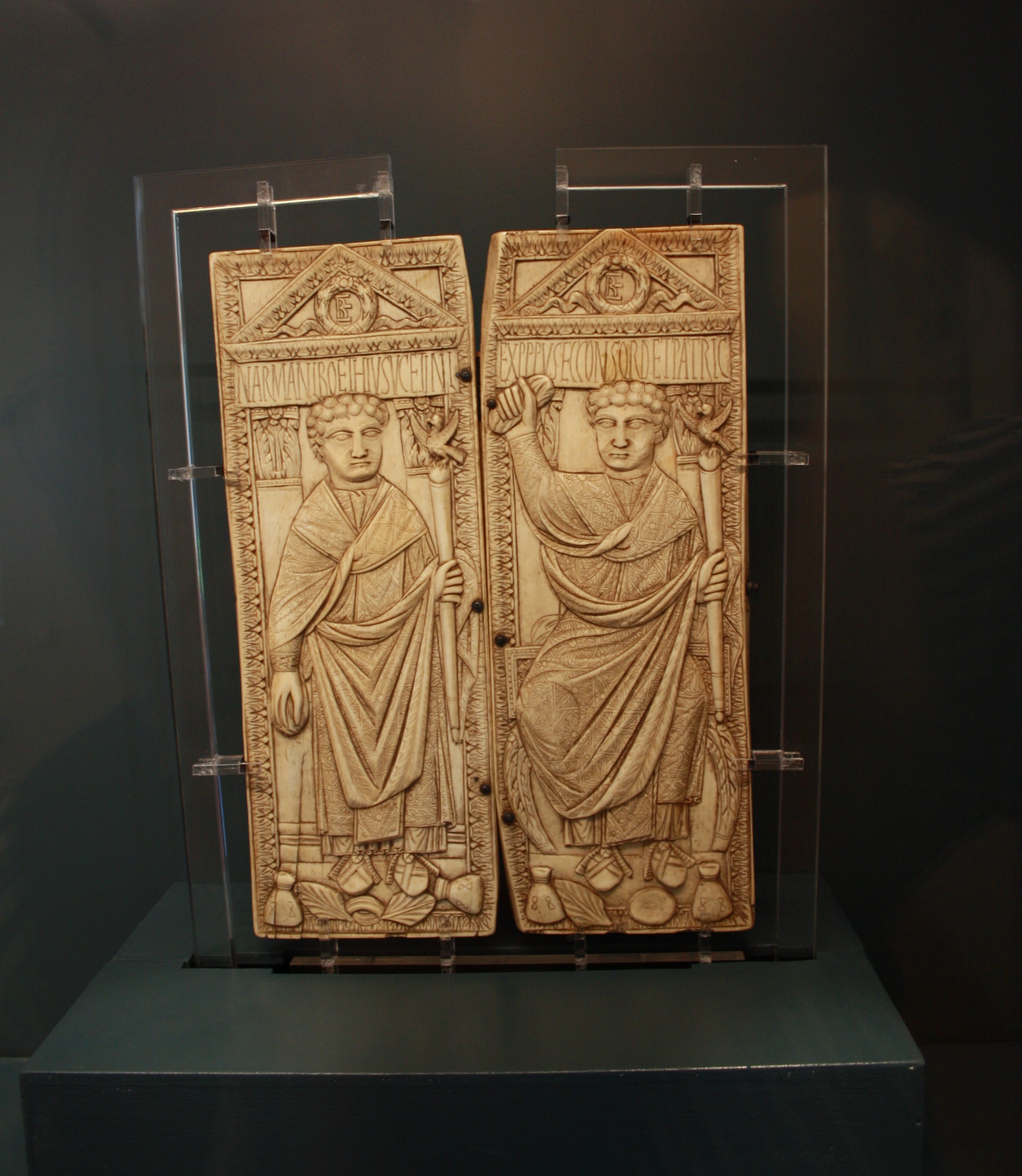
Consular diptych of Boethius

Nar. Manlius Boethius (died circa 487) was a Roman and Italian aristocrat, who was appointed consul for 487. He was likely the father of the Roman philosopher, Boethius.

== Life ==
He was probably the son of Boethius, the praetorian prefect of Italy, who was put to death by Emperor Valentinian III in 454, and probably the father of the famous philosopher Boethius; if this identification is correct, he died not long after 487, for Boethius is known to have been orphaned as a young boy and adopted by the aristocrat Quintus Aurelius Memmius Symmachus.

Boethius' career can be derived from a consular diptych preserved in Brescia. He was praefectus urbi of Rome (date unknown), then Praetorian prefect of Italy at some point between 480 and 487, when he was appointed consul (not recognised in the East), praefectus urbi for the second time and patricius.

This diptych records his second name abbreviated NAR. E. Weigand explained this abbreviation to mean N(onius) AR(rius). Although Nonius is a common name under the early Empire, Alan Cameron has pointed out the combination "Nonius Arrius" has been attested only twice in the 300 years prior to Boethius. He further notes the abbreviation "N. Ar." is unattested except for this consular diptych. Based on these considerations, he believes this explanation is untenable, and proposes NAR should be read as an abbreviation for one of two names: either "Narius", "a securely if sparsely attested Italian name"; or as an engraving error for MAR, an abbreviation for "Marius", a far more common name.

== Notes ==
Preceded by Caecina Mavortius Basilius Decius, Longinus	Consul of the Roman Empire; 487	Succeeded by Claudius Iulius Ecclesius Dynamius, Rufius Achilius Sividius
Preceded by Caecina Mavortius Basilius Decius	Praefectus urbi of Rome; 487	Succeeded by Rufius Achilius Sividius II
