= Ecclesius =

Ecclesius may refer to:

- Ecclesius of Ravenna, bishop of Ravenna, 521–532
- Claudius Julius Ecclesius Dynamius, Roman consul in 488, praefectus urbi in 490
