= Petronius Probinus =

Petronius Probinus may refer to:

- Petronius Probinus (consul 341) (fl. 341 – 346 AD), aristocrat and statesman of the Roman Empire
- Petronius Probinus (consul 489), Roman aristocrat during the reign of King Odoacer
