= Anicius Probus Faustus =

Anicius Probus Faustus Niger (fl. 490–512) was a politician of the Western Roman Empire who served as consul in 490 and as praetorian prefect of Italy from 509 to 512.

== Life ==
Faustus was the son of Gennadius Avienus, a member of an ancient and noble Roman family which traced back its origins to Marcus Valerius Messalla Corvinus, consul of the year 59. He is known to have two brothers, Rufius Magnus Faustus Avienus consul in 502, and Ennodius Messala consul in 506.

Faustus may be the same ex-consul Faustus mentioned in the Liber Pontificalis as the only aristocrat who supported Pope Symmachus in his conflict with Antipope Laurentius during the years 502–506.

== Bibliography ==
- Jones, A.H.M.; Martindale, J. R.; Morris, John, eds. (1980). "Anicius Probus Faustus iunior Niger 9". Prosopography of the Later Roman Empire. Vol. II. pp. 454–456. ISBN 0-521-20159-4.

Political offices
Preceded by Eusebius, Petronius Probinus	Roman consul 490 with Longinus	Succeeded by Anicius Olybrius Junior
