= Delbrück (surname) =

Delbrück is a German surname. Notable people with the surname include:

- Berthold Delbrück (1842–1922), linguist
- Clemens von Delbrück, German politician
- Gottlieb Adelbert Delbrück (1822–1890), lawyer, founder of Deutsche Bank
- Hans Delbrück (1848–1921), historian
- Max Delbrück (chemist) (1850–1919), chemist
- Max Delbrück (1906–1981), biologist
- Richard Delbrück (1875–1957), German archaeologist
- Rudolf von Delbrück (1817–1903), German politician
