= Rufius Achilius Sividius =

Roman politician and aristocrat

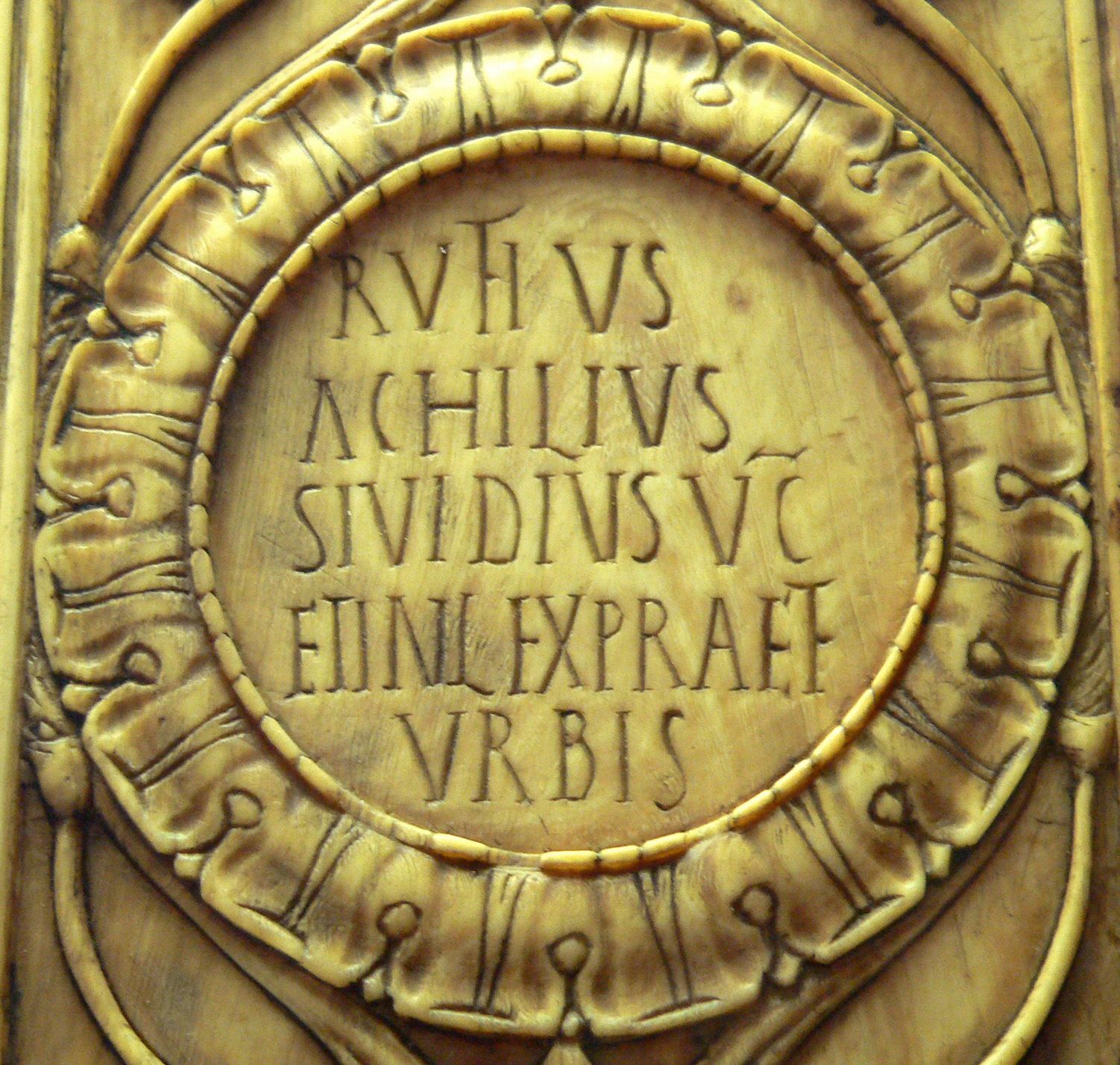
A detail of the consular diptych of Sividius

Rufius Achilius Sividius (fl. 483–488) was a Roman senator under Odoacer's rule. His brothers included Rufius Achilius Maecius Placidus, and Anicius Acilius Aginantius Faustus.

== Biography ==
He is defined as "quaestor" (perhaps quaestor sacri palatii) in the inscription on his seat at the Colosseum. His consular diptych, which records his further career, has been preserved. After his term as quaestor, Sividius was appointed praefectus urbi of Rome and then patricius. In 488 he was consul posterior with Claudius Iulius Ecclesius Dynamius, both appointed by the court of Odoacer, and praefectus urbi for the second time.

== Sources ==
- Martindale, John R., ed. (1980). "Rufius Achilius Sividius". The Prosopography of the Later Roman Empire: Volume II, AD 395–527. Cambridge: Cambridge University Press. pp. 1017–1018. ISBN 0-521-20159-4.

Political offices
Preceded by Nar. Manlius Boethius	Roman consul 488 with Claudius Julius Ecclesius Dynamius	Succeeded by Petronius Probinus; Flavius Eusebius
Preceded by Claudius Julius Ecclesius Dynamius	Urban prefect of Rome; 488	Succeeded by Claudius Julius Ecclesius Dynamius
