= Galla of Rome =

Italian Roman Catholic saint

Saint Galla
- Died: 550; Rome
- Venerated in: Catholic Church; Eastern Orthodox Church
- Canonized: Pre-congregation
- Major shrine: Chiesa di Santa Galla, Rome
- Feast: 6 April

Galla of Rome was a 6th-century Roman widow known for her generosity. She is considered a saint in the Catholic and Eastern Orthodox Churches.

== Life ==
Galla was the daughter of Roman patrician Symmachus the Younger, who was appointed consul in 485. Galla was also the sister-in-law of Boethius. Her father, Quintus Aurelius Memmius Symmachus, was condemned to death, unjustly, by Theodoric in 525. Galla had been married at a relatively young age, but was soon widowed, just over a year after her marriage.

Being wealthy, she decided to retreat to the Vatican Hill, and founded a hospital and a convent near St. Peter's Basilica. Galla is reputed to have once healed a deaf and mute girl, by blessing some water, and giving it to the girl to drink. Galla remained there for the rest of her life, tending to the sick and poor, before dying in 550.

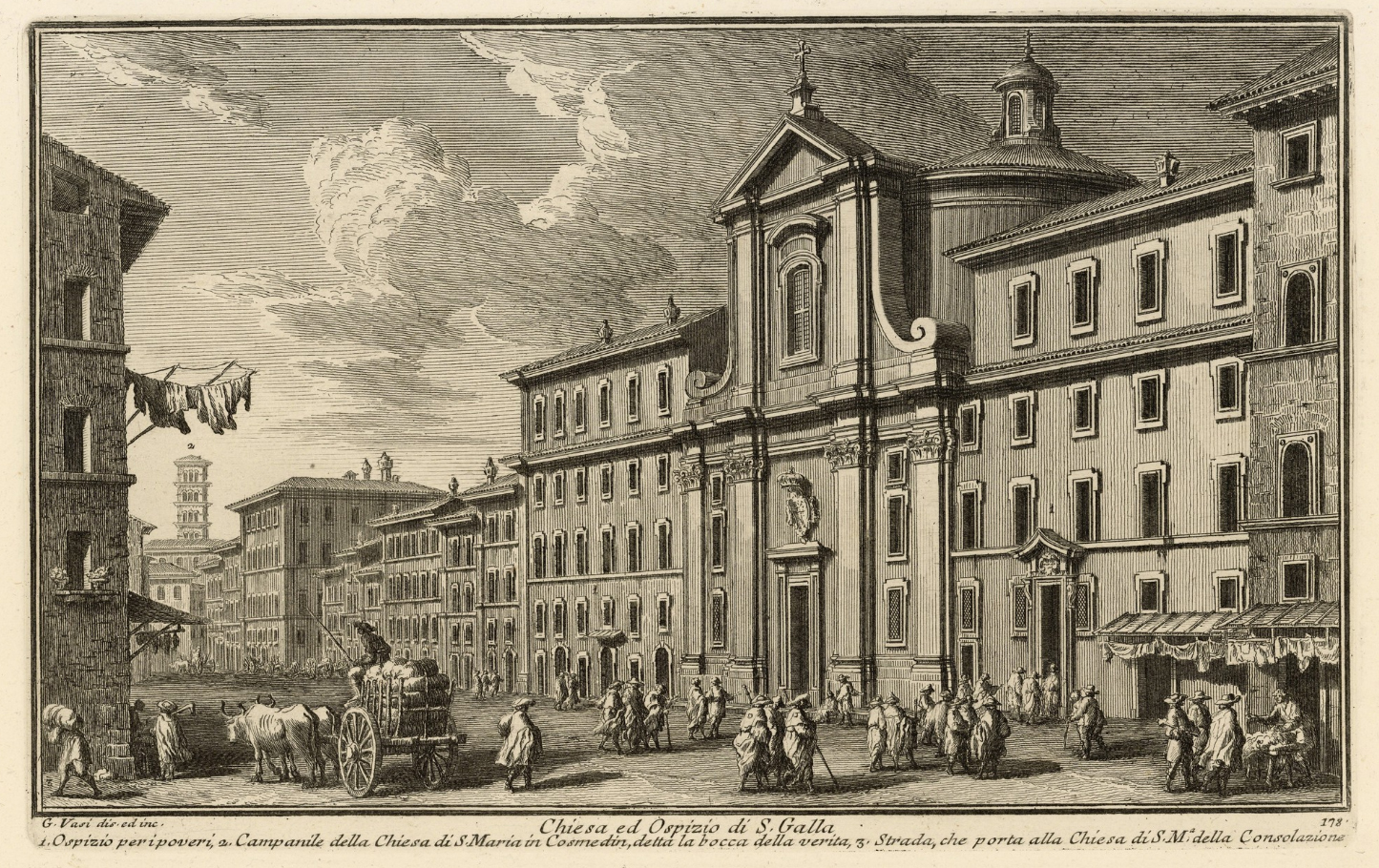
Hospice and church of St. Galla

According to tradition, in 524 in the portico of the house of Santa Galla, an icon of the Mother of God appeared in the pantry where the saint kept the food for the poor. An oratory, Santa Maria in Portico, was built on the site to house the icon, which was said to be carried in processions since 590 to avert the plague. The Hospice of St. Galla, an overnight shelter for paupers, was established next door by Pope Celestine III. When the icon was transferred to the newly built Santa Maria in Campitelli, Santa Maria in Portico began to be called Santa Galla Antiqua in honor of its foundress.

== Legacy ==
Galla's biography is in the Dialogues of Gregory the Great. Galla is also believed to be the inspiration for the letter of Fulgentius of Ruspe, titled "De statu viduarum".

The new church dedicated to Galla, located in the Ostiense quarter, was consecrated in 1940.

Galla is one of the 140 saints whose images adorn St. Peter's Square's colonnade.
