= Caecina Decius Basilius =

Caecina Decius Basilius (fl. 458–468) was a politician of the Western Roman Empire, Consul and twice Praetorian prefect of Italy.

== Biography ==
Basilius belonged to the Italian nobility, and was member of the influential gens Caecinia.

He was Praetorian prefect of Italy in 458, under Emperor Majorian. Emperor Libius Severus (461–465) honoured Basilius with the consulate of the year 463 (during which he was already Patricius), also naming him Praetorian prefect of Italy, a position Basilius held until 465.

The Gallo-Roman poet Sidonius Apollinaris, arrived in Rome in 467, tells that Basilius was one of the two most influential civil officers in Rome in the 460s, together with Gennadius Avienus. Sidonius asked Basilius' help, as he needed to petition Emperor Anthemius on behalf of his people; Basilius suggested that he compose a panegyric in honour of the Emperor, in occasion of the beginning of Anthemius' consulate (January 1, 468). After the declamation, Basilius interceded with Anthemius for Sidonius, and the Emperor made the Gallo-Roman poet a senator, a Patricius and Praefectus urbi.

Basilius had three sons, all of them consuls: Caecina Mavortius Basilius Decius (consul in 486), Decius Marius Venantius Basilius (consul in 484), and Basilius iunior (consul in 480), identified with Caecina Decius Maximus Basilius.

== Bibliography ==
- Martindale, John R., ed. (1980). The Prosopography of the Later Roman Empire: Volume II, AD 395–527. Cambridge: Cambridge University Press. pp. 216–217. ISBN 0-521-20159-4.

Political offices
Preceded by Libius Severus Augustus; Leo Augustus II	Roman consul 463 with Vivianus	Succeeded by Rusticius; Anicius Olybrius
