= Decius Marius Venantius Basilius =

Roman politician

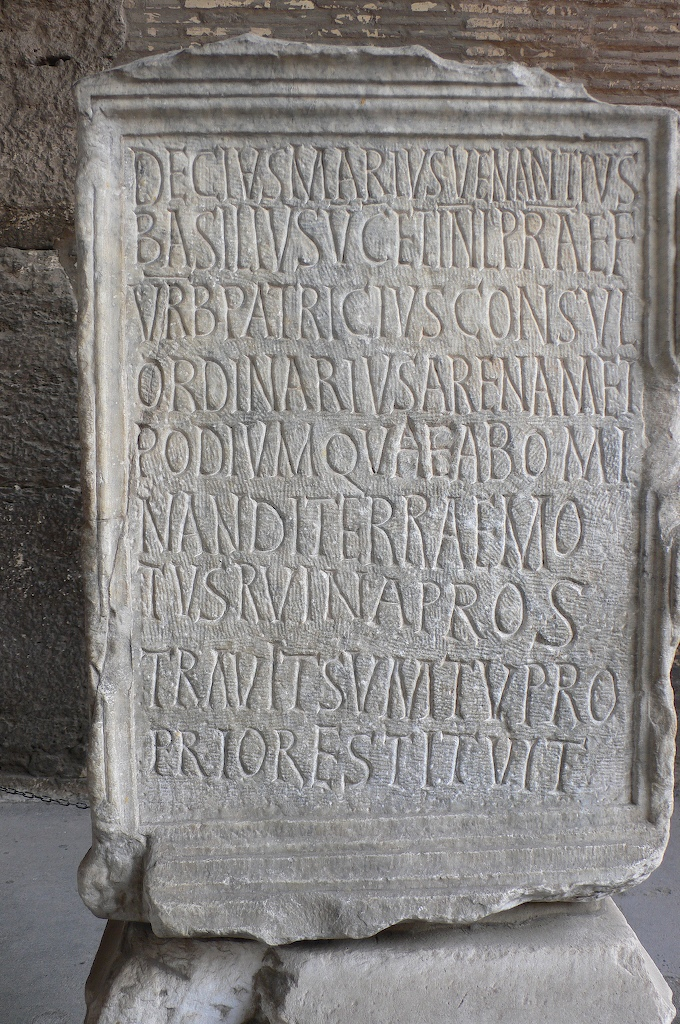
Inscription erected by Basilius at the Colosseum in Rome, one of the two copies produced in occasion of a restoration funded by Basilius after the damages of an earthquake (CIL VI, 1716).

(Caecina) Decius Marius Venantius Basilius (fl. 484) was a Roman official under Odoacer's rule.

== Biography ==
He was the son of Caecina Decius Basilius and the brother of Caecina Mavortius Basilius Decius and Caecina Decius Maximus Basilius, all Roman consuls. Basilius Venantius, consul in 508, was probably his son.

Venantius was Praefectus urbi and consul in 484, working in the post-Roman Kingdom of Odoacer and thence Kingdom of the Ostrogoths, with Theodoric the Great as colleague.

He financed the restoration of the damages made by an earthquake to the Colosseum of Rome; two inscriptions are still extant, reading (CIL VI, 1716 b and c):

DECIVS MARIVS VENANTIVS
BASILIVS V[IR] C[LARISSIMVS] ET INL[VSTRIS] PRAEF[ECTVS]
VRB[I] PATRICIVS CONSVL
ORDINARIVS ARENAM ET
PODIVM QVAE ABOMI
NANDI TERRAEMO
TVS RVINA PROS
TRAVIT SVM[P]TV PRO
PRIO RESTITVIT

Translation:

Decius Marius Venantius Basilius, vir clarissimus and inlustris, Praefectus urbi, Patricius, Consul ordinarius restored at his own expenses the arena and the podium, destroyed by a terrible earthquake

== Bibliography ==
- Martindale, John R., ed. (1980). "Decius Marius Venantius Basilius 13". The Prosopography of the Later Roman Empire: Volume II, AD 395–527. Cambridge: Cambridge University Press. p. 218. ISBN 0-521-20159-4.

Political offices
Preceded by Anicius Acilius Aginatius Faustus, Post consulatum Trocundis (East)	Roman consul 484 with Theodericus	Succeeded by Quintus Aurelius Memmius Symmachus, Post consulatum Theoderici (East)
Preceded by unknown, possibly Anicius Acilius Aginantius Faustus	Urban prefect of Rome; 484	Succeeded by Quintus Aurelius Memmius Symmachus
