= Eusebius (consul 489) =

Flavius Eusebius (Greek: Εὐσέβιος) was a bureaucrat of the Eastern Roman Empire. He was magister officiorum (492-497) under the rule of Anastasius I, and appointed twice consul for Constantinople: once in 489 with Petronius Probinus as his Western counterpart; and again in 493 with Albinus as his counterpart.

The fact he was appointed consul twice suggests he was somehow related to the Emperor Anastasius.

Political offices
Preceded by Claudius Iulius Ecclesius Dynamius, and Rufius Achilius Sividius	Consul of the Roman Empire; 489; With: Petronius Probinus	Succeeded by Flavius Longinus, and Anicius Probus Faustus
Preceded by Flavius Anastasius Augustus and Flavius Rufus	Consul of the Roman Empire; 493; With: Albinus	Succeeded by Flavius Turcius Rufius Apronianus Asterius, and Flavius Praesidius
