= Consular diptych =

Type of Roman diptych to commemorate a consul

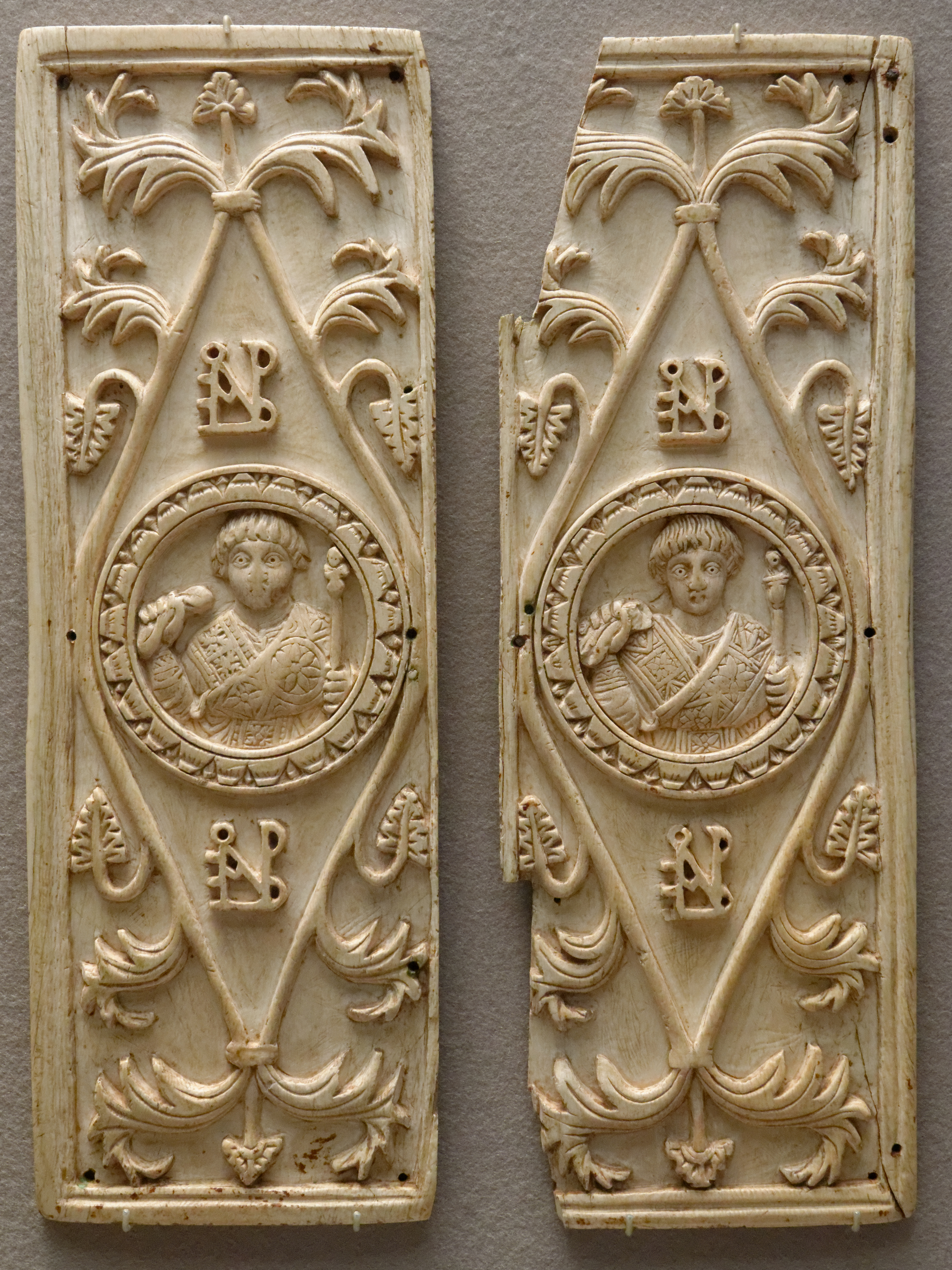
One of the consular diptychs of Areobindus Dagalaiphus Areobindus, consul in 506, showing him in an imago clipeata (Louvre, Paris)

In Late Antiquity, a consular diptych was a type of diptych intended as a de-luxe commemorative object. The diptychs were generally in ivory, wood or metal and decorated with rich relief sculpture. A consular diptych was commissioned by a consul ordinarius to mark his entry to that post, and was distributed as a commemorative reward to those who had supported his candidature or might support him in the future.

== History ==
=== Origins ===
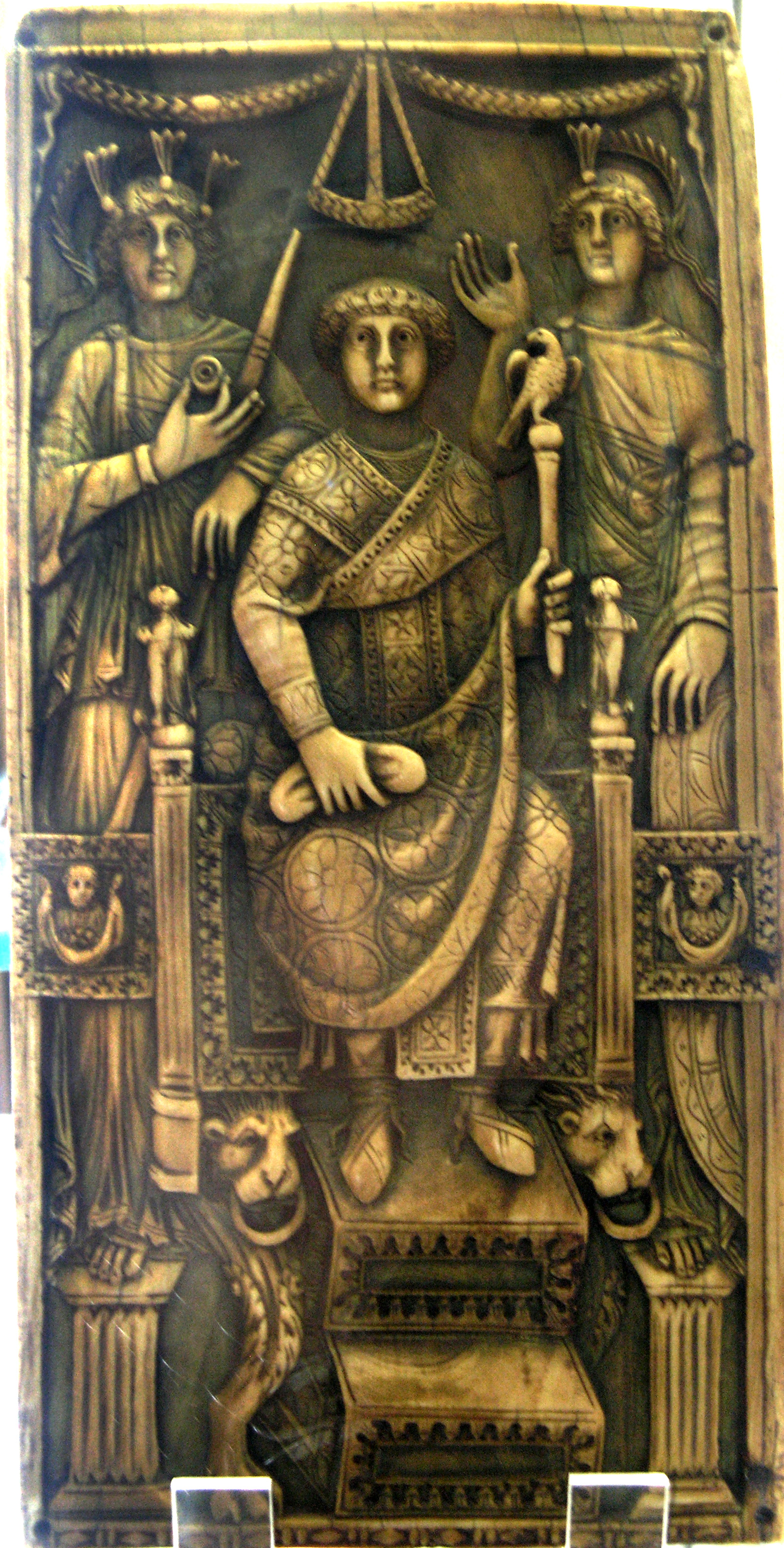
Consular diptych of Magnus, who was consul of Constantinople in 518. He sits between figures representing Rome and Constantinople. Louvre

From as early as the first century AD, some formal letters of appointment to office were known as "codicilli", little books, two or more flat pieces of (usually) wood, joined by clasps, lined with wax on which was written the letter of appointment. Later, the letter might be written on papyrus and presented within the covers. By the late fourth century, however, specially-commissioned diptychs began to be included among the gifts that appointees to high office distributed to celebrate and publicize the public games that were their principal duties. These diptychs were made of ivory, with relief carvings on the outside chosen by the donor, looking superficially similar to codicils but containing no writing and with no official status.

The routine distribution of such diptychs in the East is marked by a decision by Theodosius I in 384 to limit expenditure on the games of Constantinople by reserving ivory diptychs (and golden gifts) to consuls alone. In the western empire, they became a usual part of the public displays given by great aristocrats. Quintus Aurelius Symmachus, for example, distributed some to commemorate his son's quaestorian games in 393 and praetorian games in 401 respectively. Almost all depict the games, and on three occasions Symmachus links the presentation of these diptychs with the completion of the games. Their end is marked by the consulship's disappearance under the reign of Justinian in 541.

The oldest diptych that can properly be called a consular diptych, held in the cathedral treasury at Aosta, is one commissioned by Anicius Petronius Probus (he was a consul in the Western Empire in 406) – it is unique not only for its extreme antiquity but also as the only one to bear the portrait of the Emperor (Honorius in this instance, to whom the diptych is dedicated in an inscription full of humility, with Probus calling himself the emperor's "famulus" or servant) rather than that of the consul.

Later, consular diptychs systematically carried either a more or less elaborate portrait of the consul on the most richly decorated examples or a dedicatory inscription to him within a geometric and vegetal scheme on the simpler examples. The simpler examples were probably produced as a series from models prepared in advance, with the more sophisticated (and thus more expensive) diptychs reserved for the inner circle of the Roman aristocracy. The workshops responsible for their production were to be found in the Empire's two capitals at Rome and Constantinople, but the fall of the Western Roman Empire in 476 was probably responsible for the disappearance of western production at the end of the 5th century, with all surviving consular diptychs from the 6th century originating from Constantinople. The most common motif on 6th century consular diptychs from Constantinople shows the consul, standing, presiding over the consular games which marked his entry to the consulship.

By their very nature, consular diptychs are a valuable tool for the prosopography of the late Roman Empire as well as for the study of the art of this period. Large numbers of them have survived to the present day, in many cases due to their re-use as book covers for medieval ecclesiastical manuscripts. Some were also used in churches as grand bindings for lists of bishops and similar records. The Barberini Ivory is a much rarer Imperial diptych, probably of Justinian.

== Gallery ==
In chronological order of production (some shown with a single surviving panel):

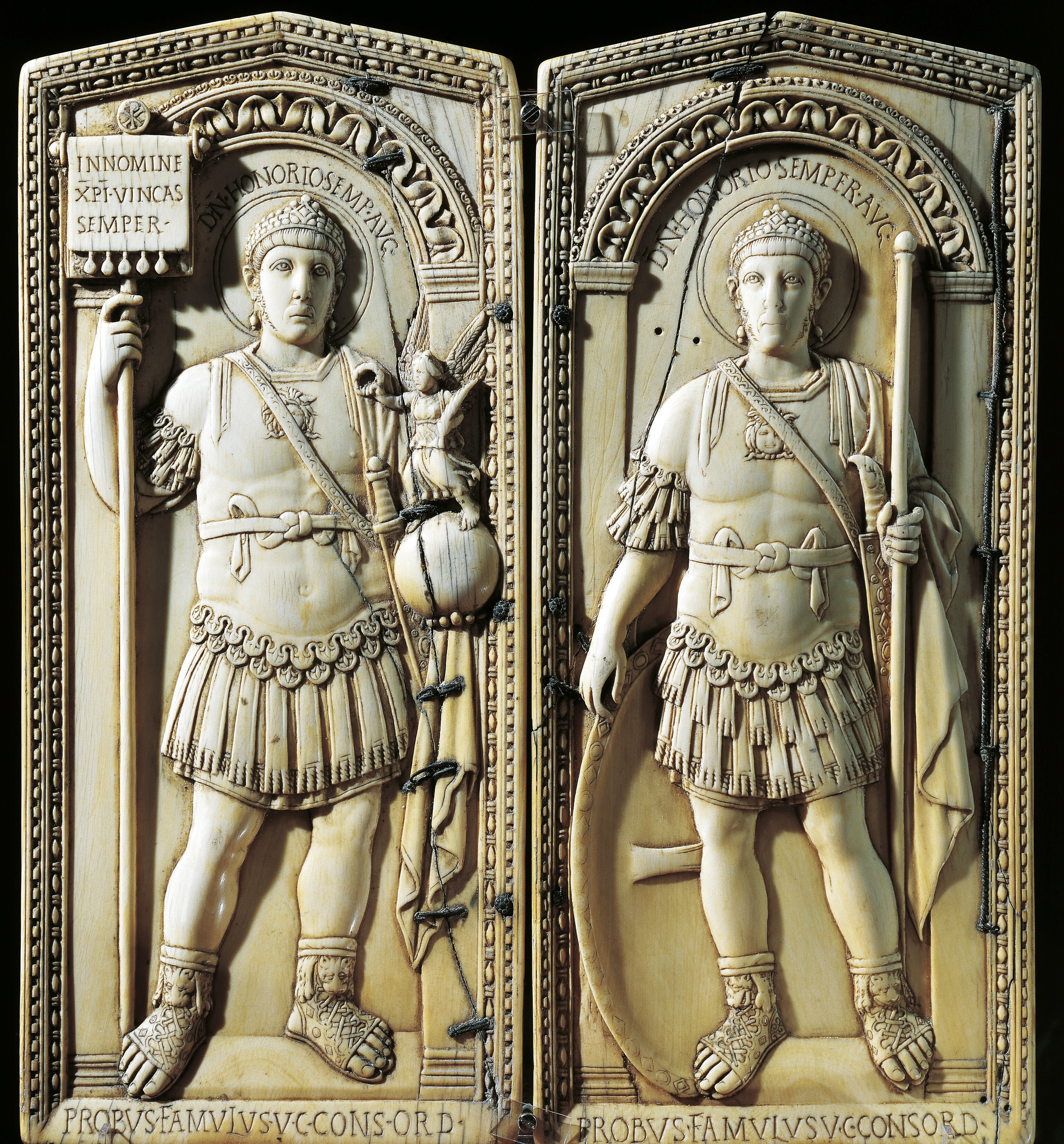
Diptych of Anicius Petronius Probus, consul in 406, depicting emperor Honorius (oldest surviving example)

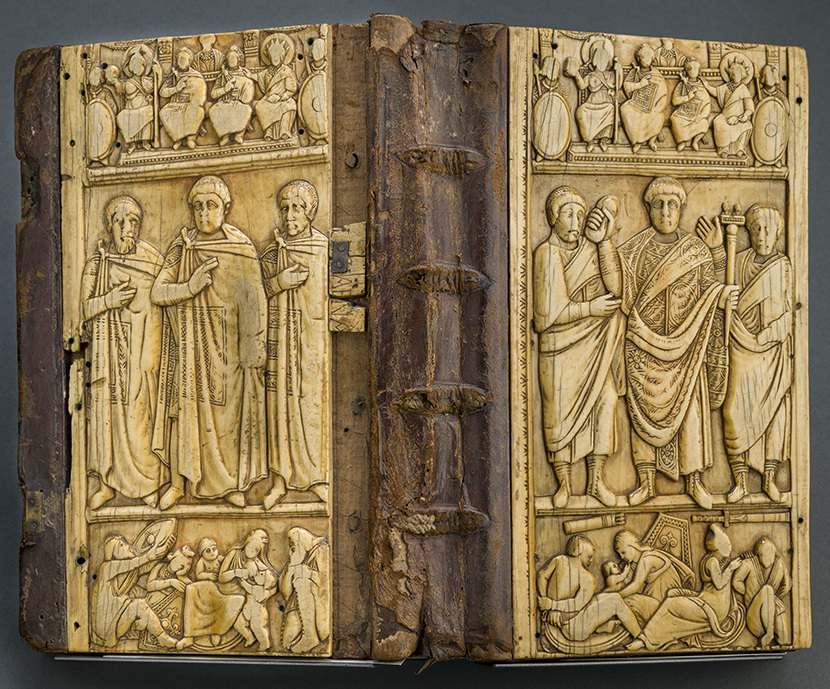
Diptych of Constantius III, produced for his consulate in 413 or 417.

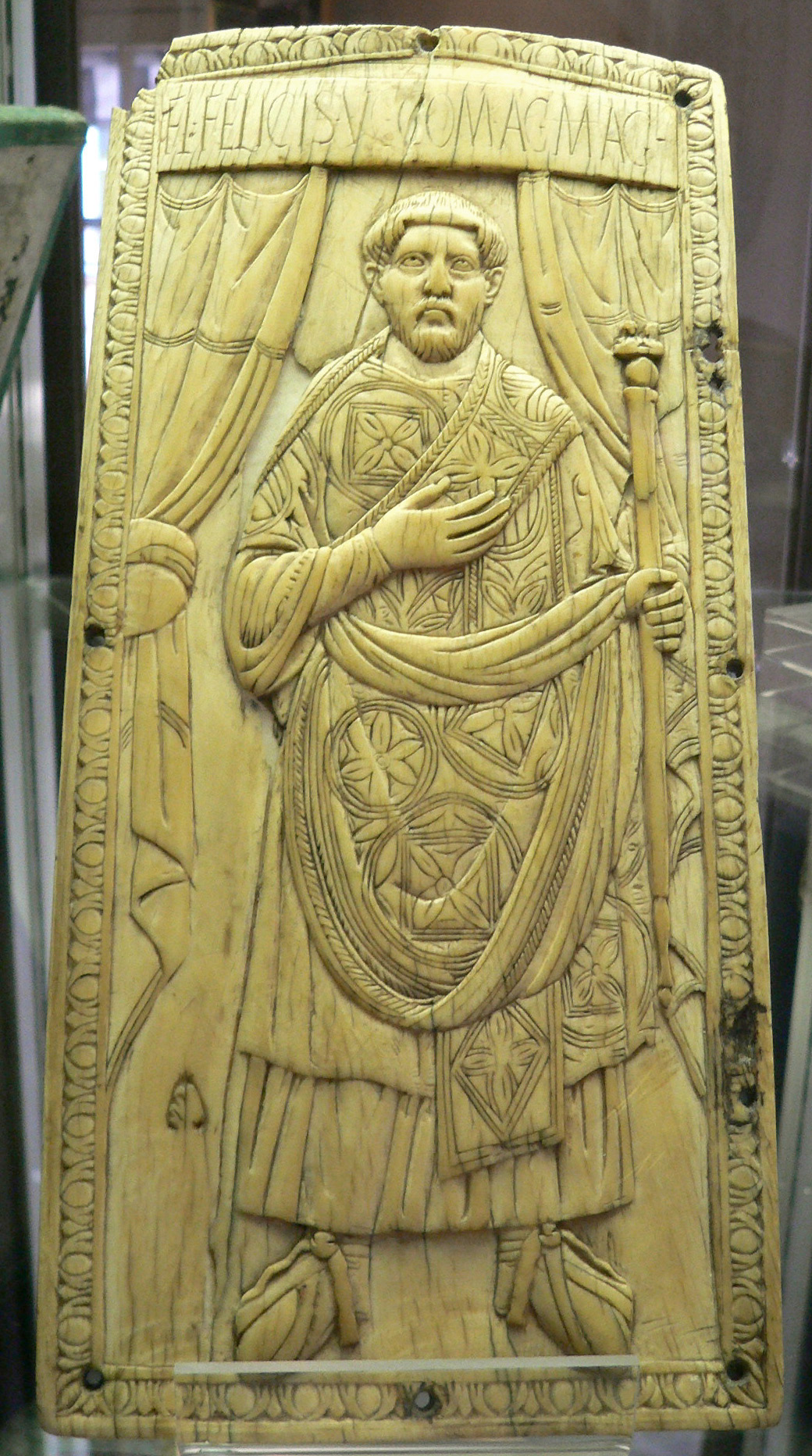
Diptych of Felix, consul in 428

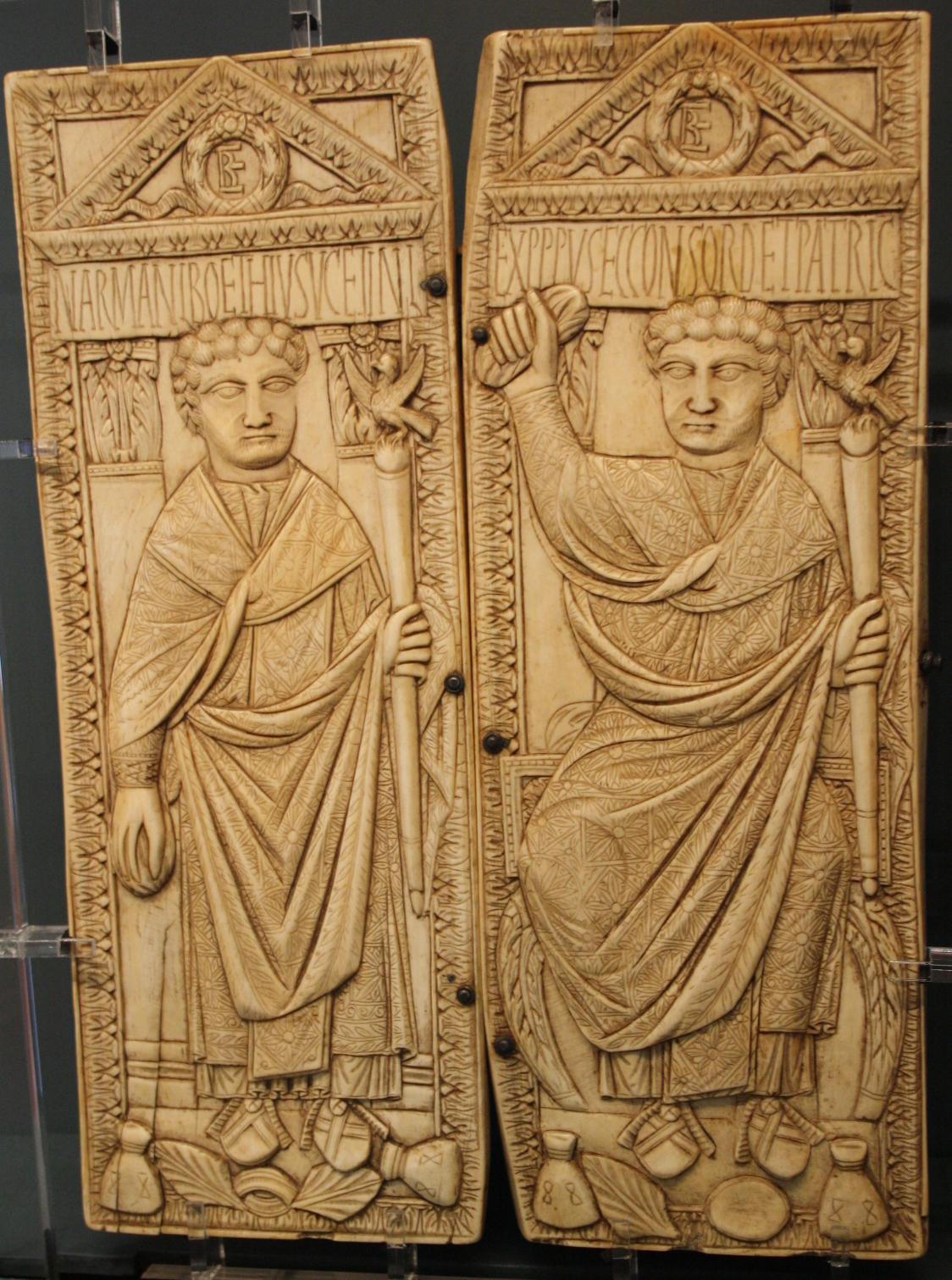
Diptych of Manlius Boethius, consul in 487

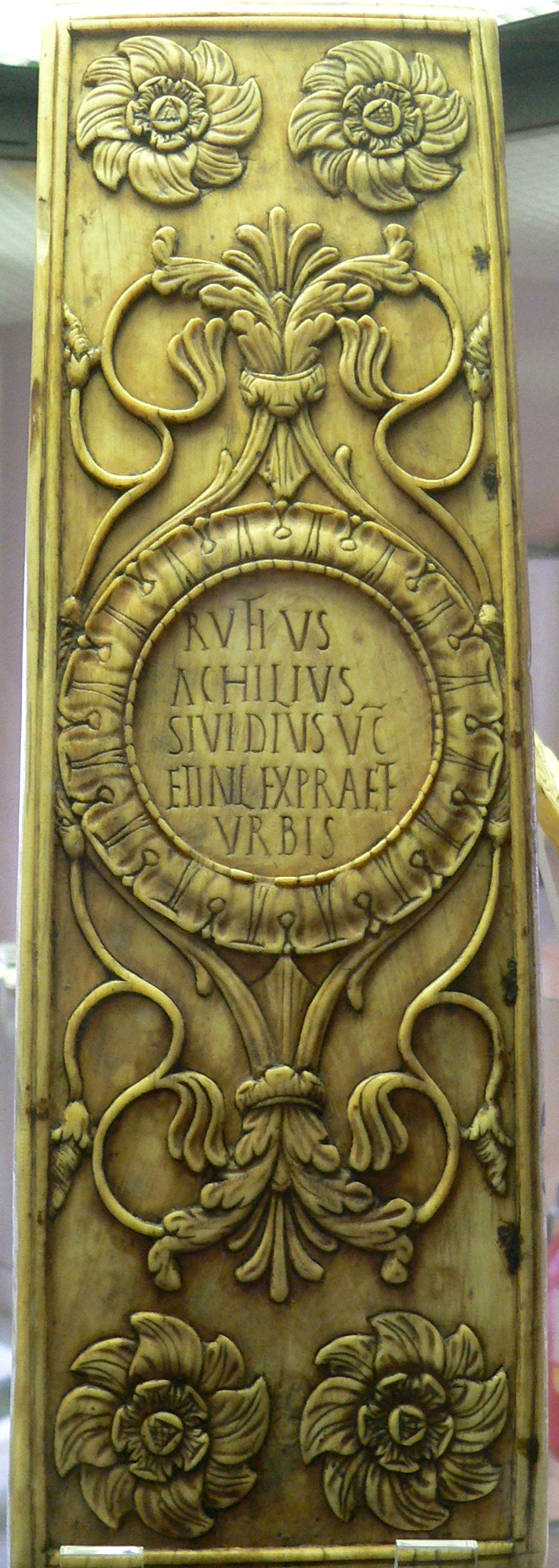
Diptych of Rufius Achilius Sividius, consul in 488

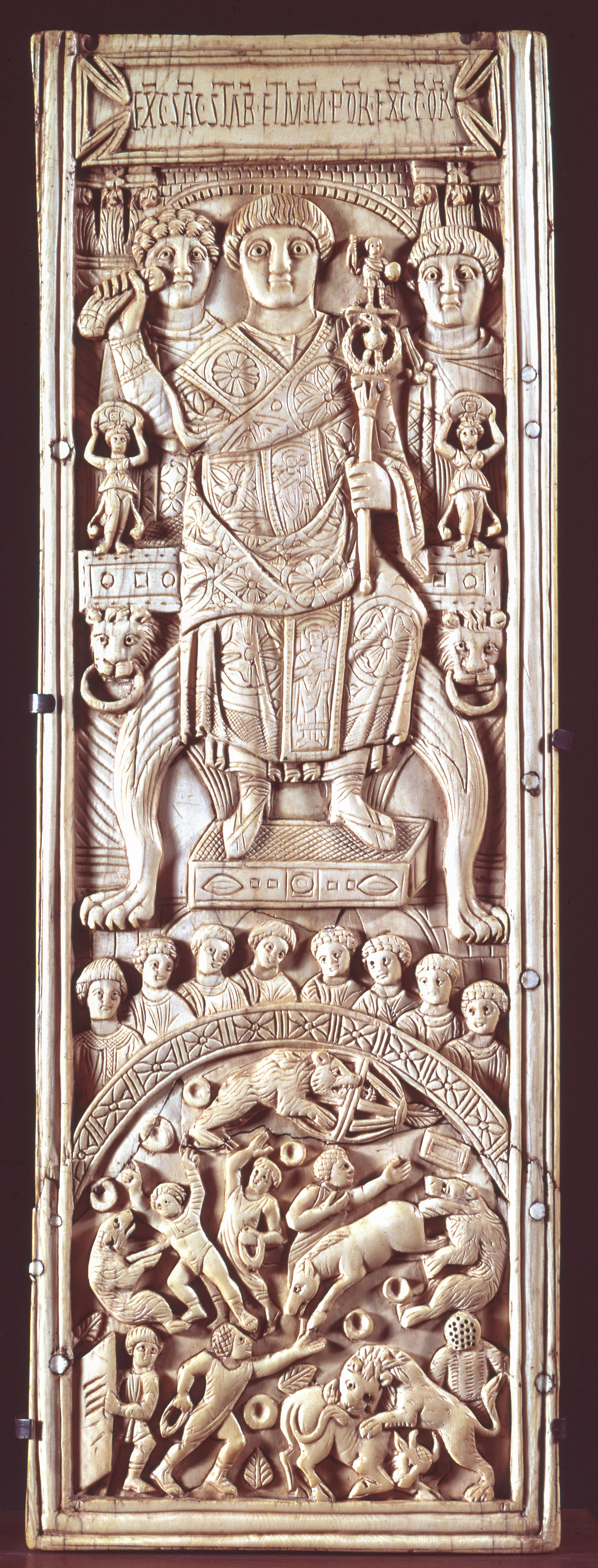
Diptych of Areobindus Dagalaiphus Areobindus, consul in 506

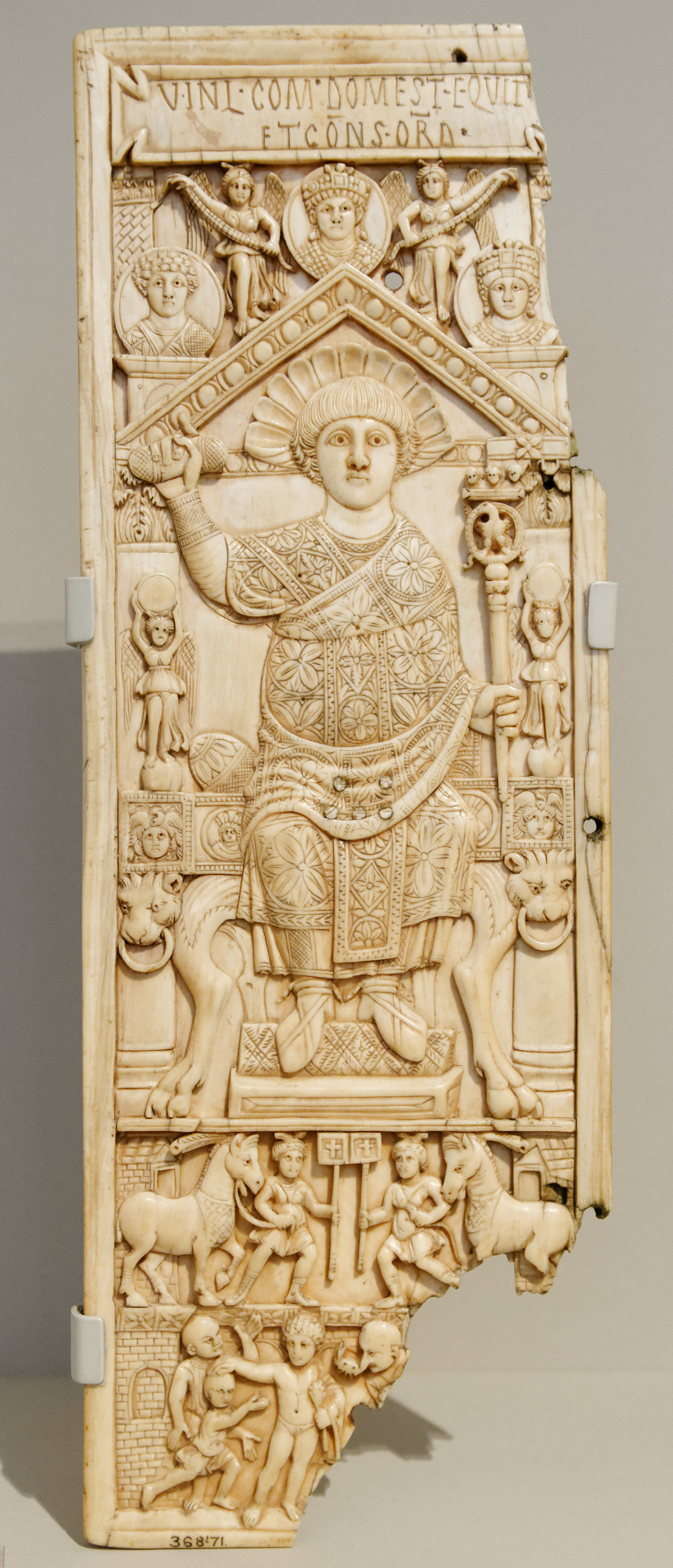
Diptych of Anastasius, consul in 517 (London)

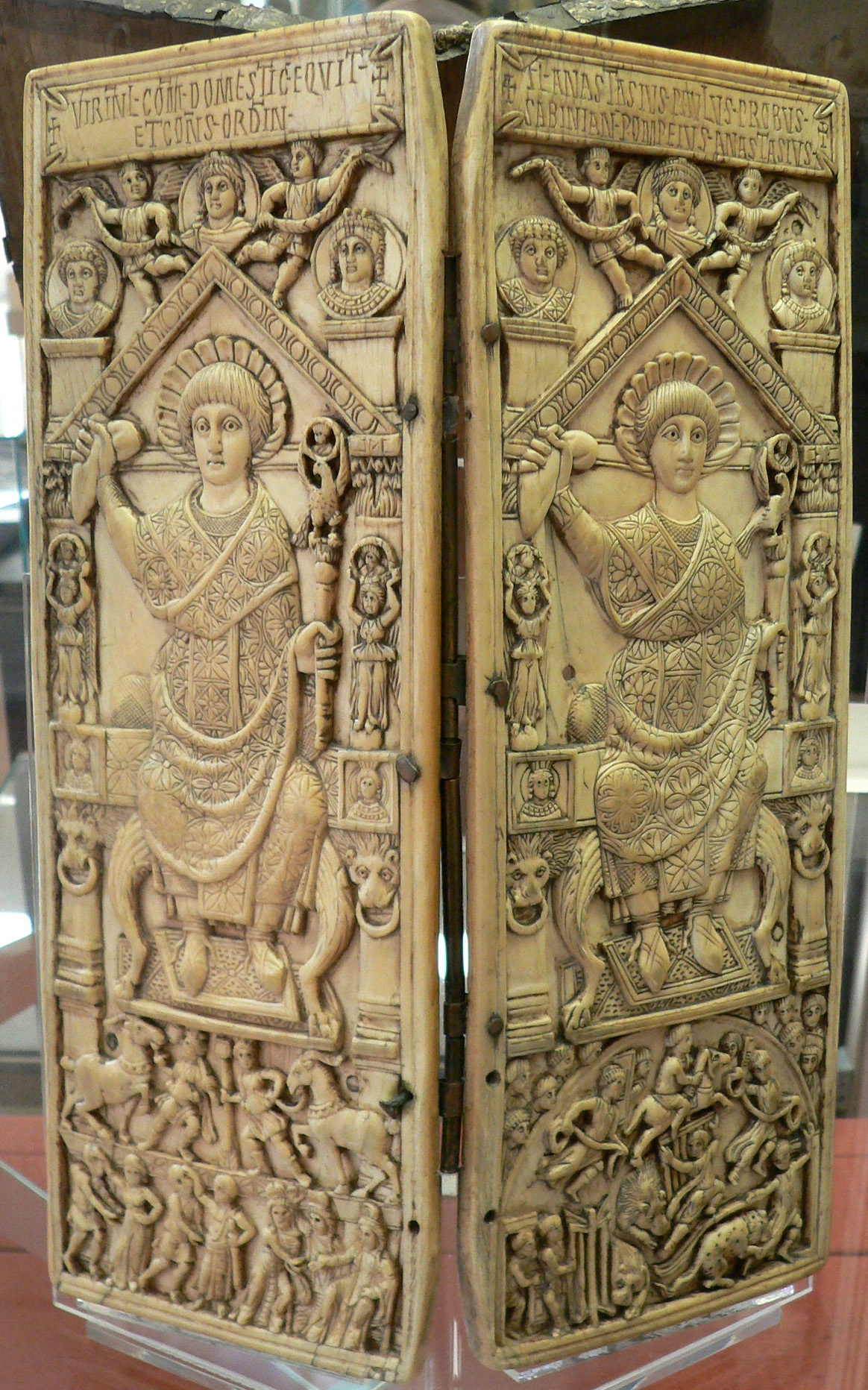
Diptych of Anastasius, consul in 517 (Paris)

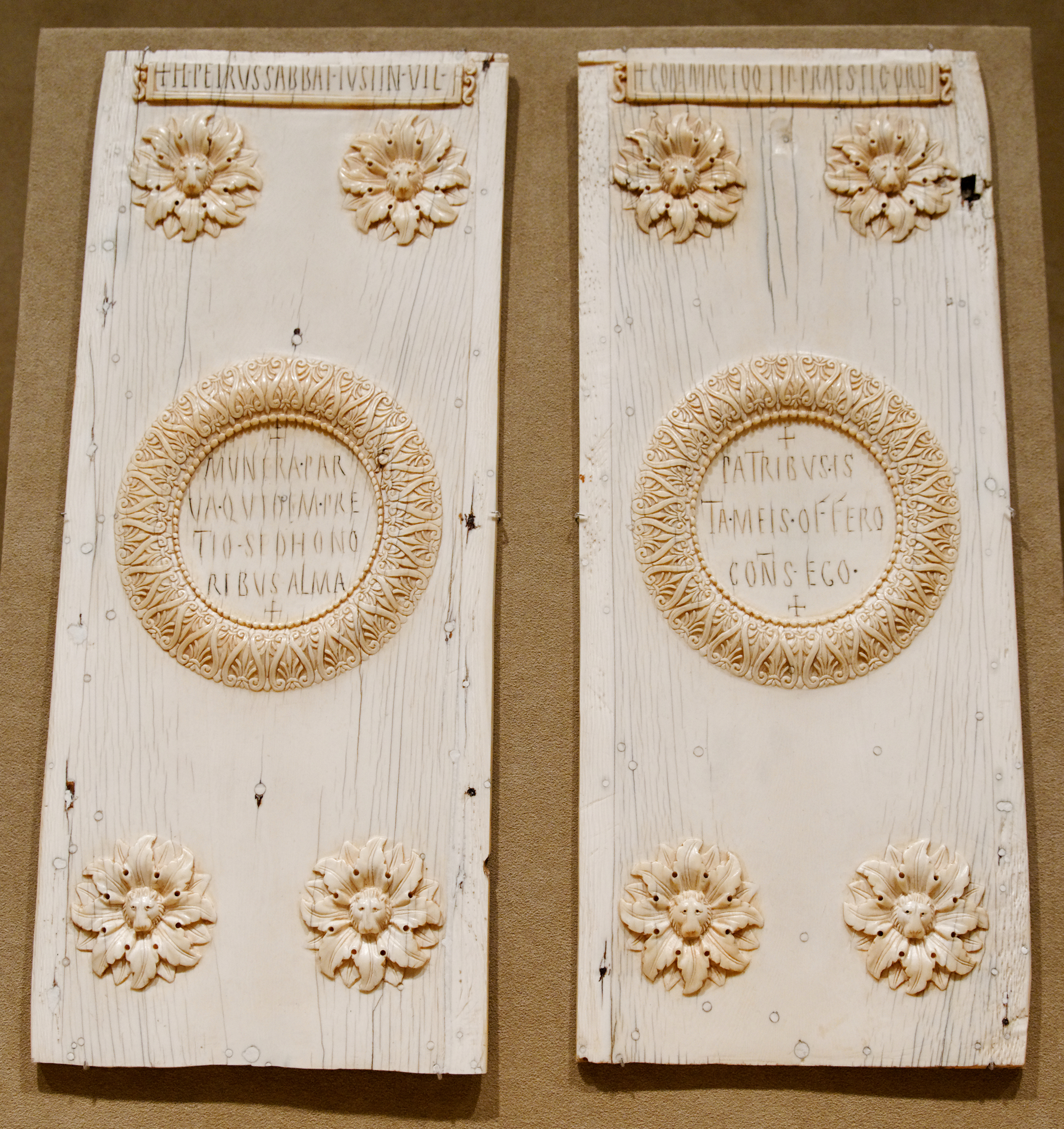
Diptych of Justinian, consul in 521

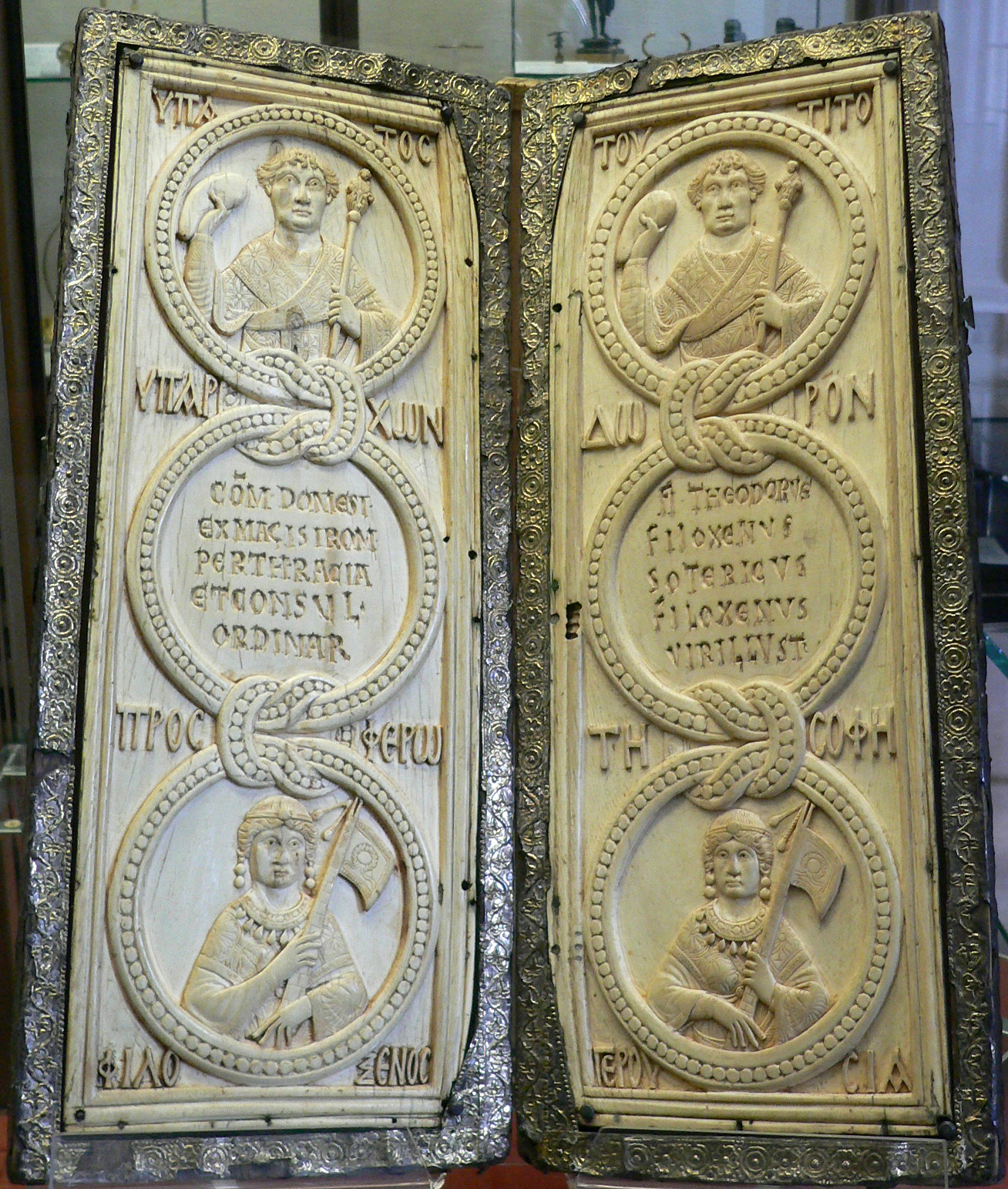
Diptych of Theodorus Filoxenus Sotericus Filoxenus, consul in 525

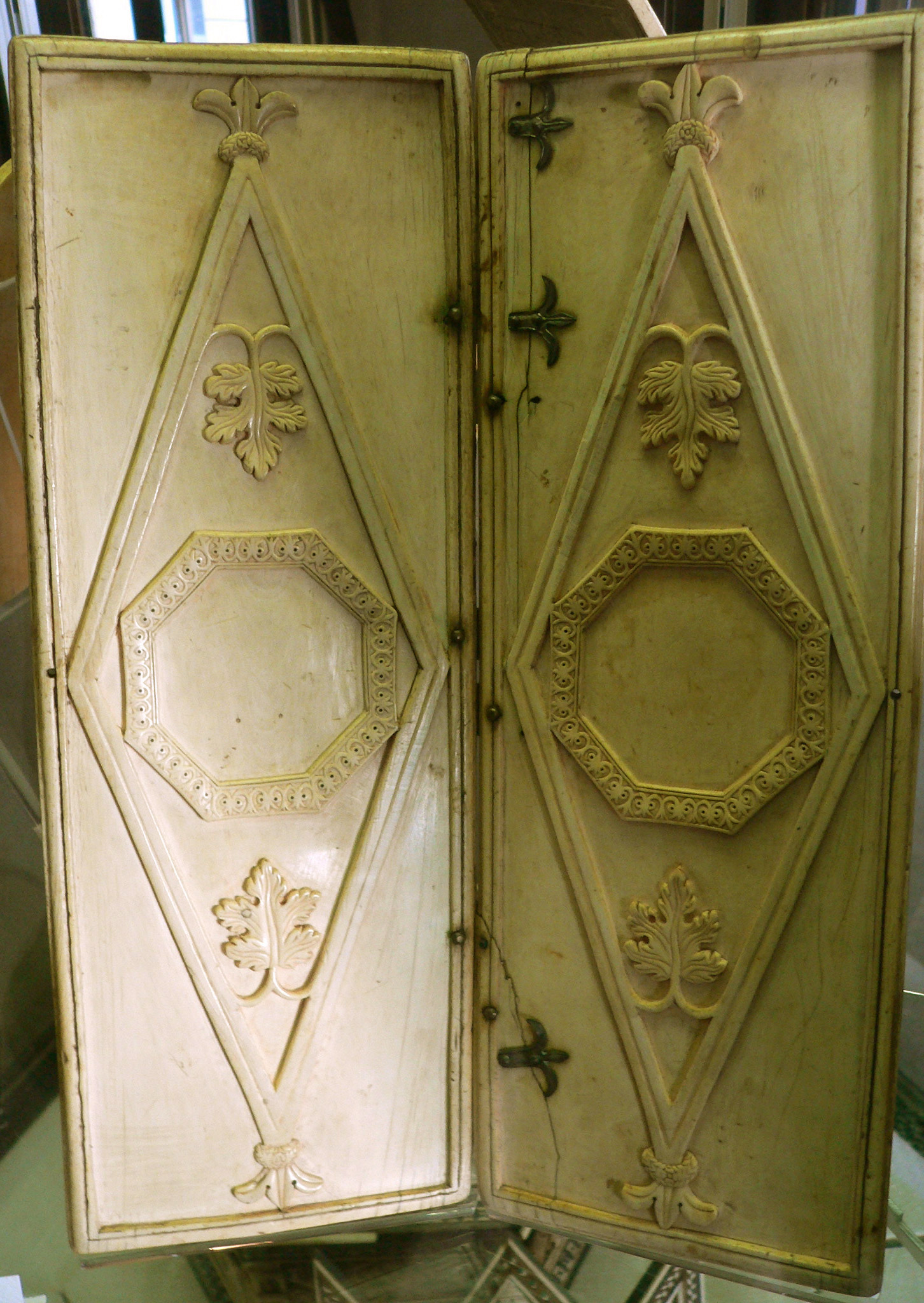
Diptych of Theodorus Filoxenus Sotericus Filoxenus, consul in 525

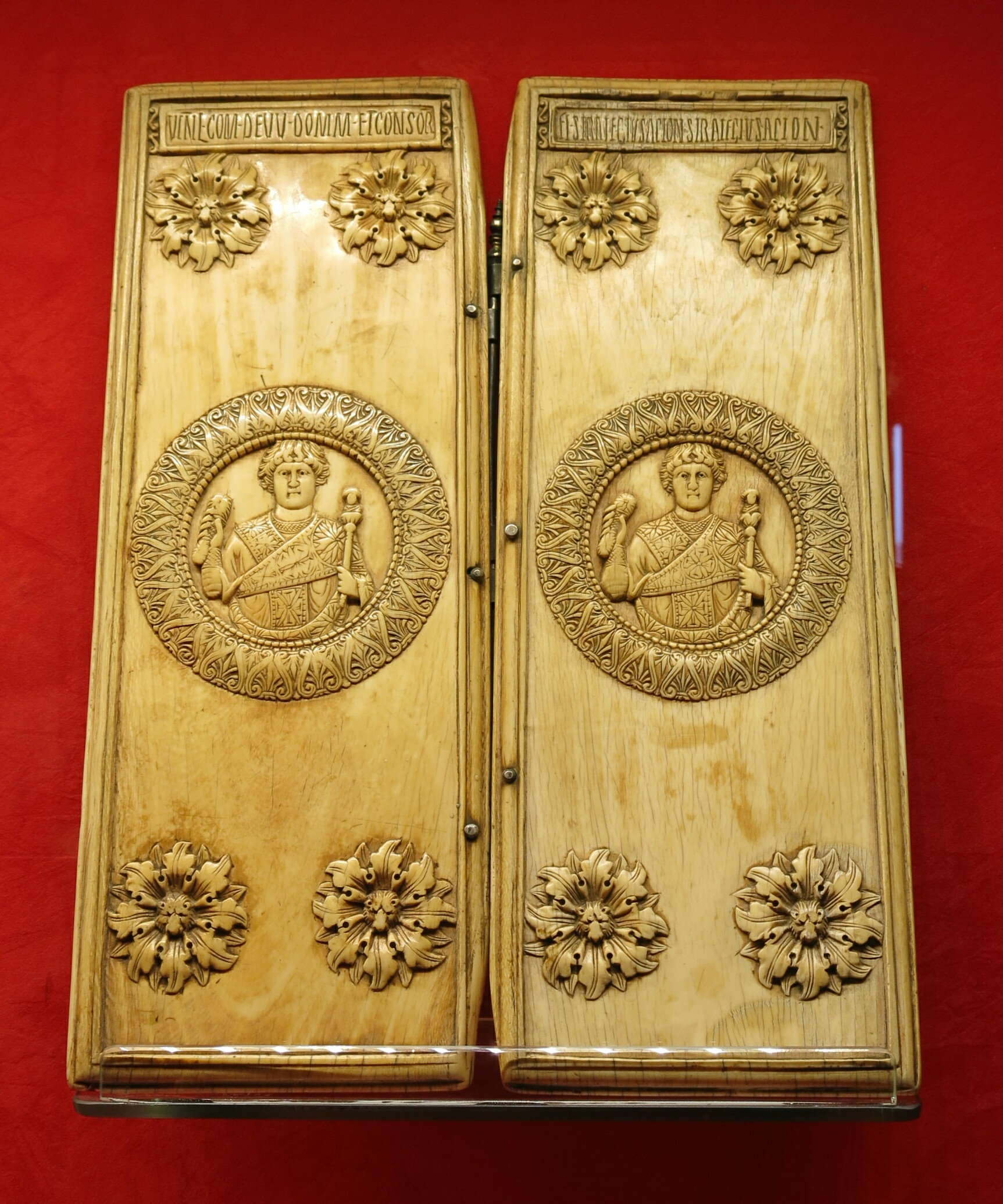
Diptych of Strategius Apion, sole consul in 539, second last surviving example.

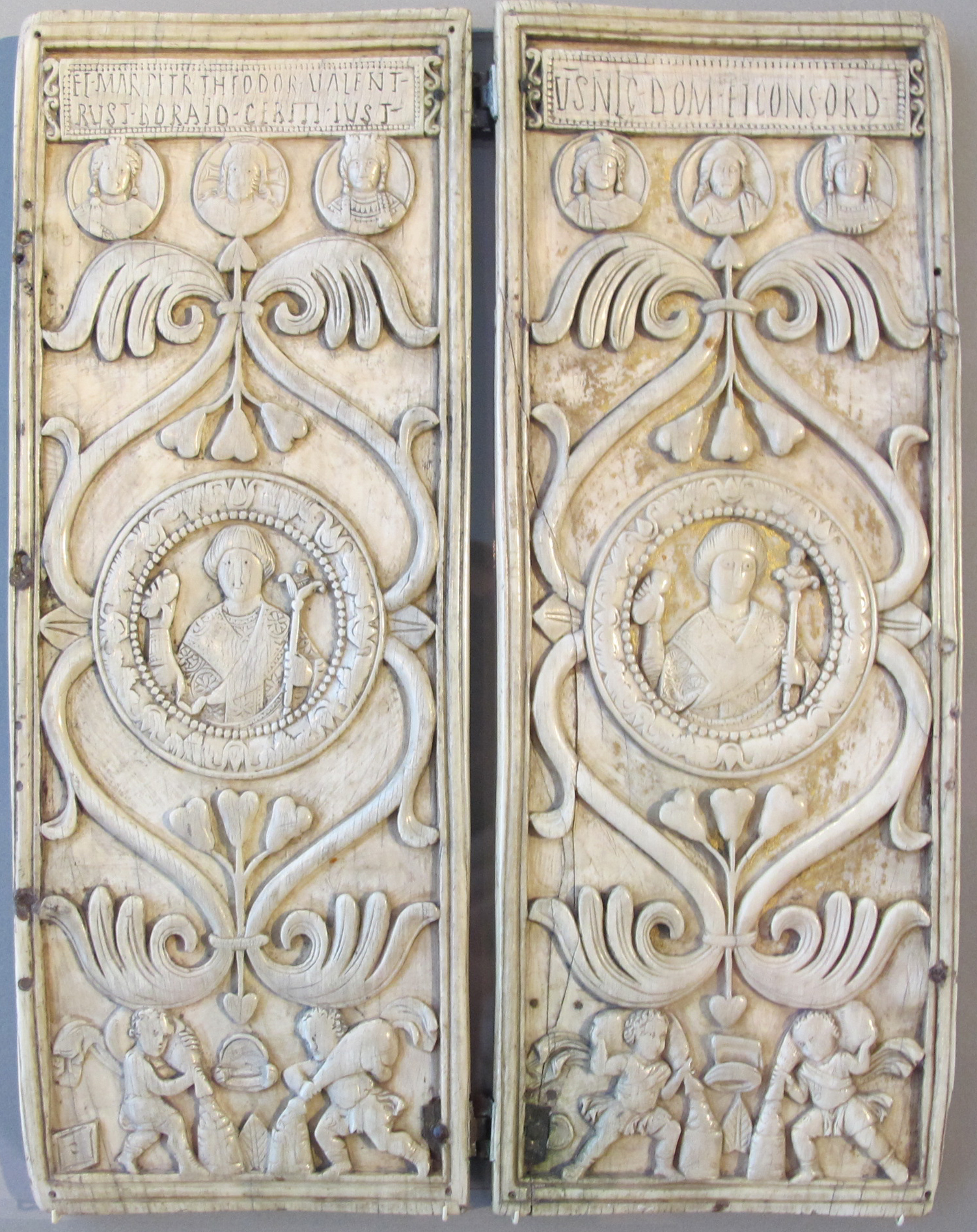
Diptych of Justin, consul in 540 (last surviving example)

== Bibliography ==
- Alexander Kazhdan (editor), The Oxford Dictionary of Byzantium, 3 vols., Oxford University Press, 1991 (ISBN 0195046528), s. v. "Diptych", vol. 1, pp. 636–637.
- Kiilerich, Bente (1993). Late Fourth Century Classicism in the Plastic Arts: Studies in the So-called Theodosian Renaissance. Odense University Classical Studies 18. Odense University Press. ISBN 87-7492-929-1.
- Danièle Gaborit-Chopin (1993). "Les ivoires du Ve au VIIIe siècle" in J. Durant (éd.), Byzance, l'art byzantin dans les collections publiques françaises (catalogue of an exhibition at the Louvre, 3 November 1992 – 1 February 1993). Paris, pp. 42–45. (in French)
- Richard Delbrück (1929). Die Consulardiptychen und verwandte Denkmäler. Berlin. (in German)
- Cameron, Alan (2013). "Origin, Context and Function of Consular Diptychs". Journal of Roman Studies. 103: 174–207. doi:10.1017/S0075435813000099. S2CID 162284518.
