= Anicius Acilius Aginantius Faustus =

Roman senator

Anicius Acilius Aginantius (or Aginatius) Faustus (fl. 483–508), also known as Faustus albus ("white"), was a Roman politician under Odoacer's rule. His brothers included Rufius Achilius Maecius Placidus, and Rufius Achilius Sividius.

== Life ==
Faustus' career is attested by two inscriptions on seats of the Colosseum.

He is attested as praefectus urbi of Rome in an inscription celebrating his work in restoring an image of Minerva damaged by a falling roof during a riot. The riot can be identified with the civil war that led to the deposition and death of Emperor Anthemius in 472, while the restoration could have been performed under Odoacer, but before 483.

In 483 he was appointed consul, without colleague. It is probable that he was not recognised by the Eastern court.

In 502-503 he could have been appointed praefectus urbi for the second time. In those years he was contacted by Magnus Felix Ennodius to be appointed advocatus fisci in Liguria. Ennodius wrote him also in 506 and 508. He might also be the recipient of a letter by Avitus of Vienne, and also of a letter from Theoderic the Great to Faustus, praepositus.

== Bibliography ==
- Martindale, John R., ed. (1980). "Anicius Acilius Aginantius Faustus iunior (albus) 4". The Prosopography of the Later Roman Empire: Volume II, AD 395–527. Cambridge: Cambridge University Press. pp. 451–452. ISBN 0-521-20159-4.

Political offices
Preceded by Severinus; Illus Trocundes	Roman consul 483	Succeeded by Decius Marius Venantius Basilius; Theodericus
