= Caecina Mavortius Basilius Decius =

Roman politician and aristocrat

Caecina Mavortius Basilius Decius (fl. 486–510) was a Roman politician under Odoacer's rule. He was consul and Praefectus urbi of Rome in 486 and Praetorian prefect of Italy from 486 to 493.

== Life ==
Decius was the son of Caecina Decius Basilius, consul in 463, and brother of Decius Marius Venantius Basilius (consul in 484), and Basilius (consul in 480, identified with Caecina Decius Maximus Basilius); thus he was a member of the gens Caecinia. He had a son, Vettius Agorius Basilius Mavortius, who was consul in 527.

Decius returned to favor under the rule of Theodoric the Great, by reclaiming a portion of the Pontine Marshes at his own expense. He was praised for this in a letter signed by Theodoric, and Decius set up an inscription at Terracina stating this was done by the command of King Theodoric. Around 510, Decius was one of five senators appointed to investigate charges that the vir inlustris Basilius and Praetextatus had practiced black magic.

== Notes ==
Political offices
| Preceded by Q. Aurelius Memmius Symmachus | Roman consul 486 with Longinus | Succeeded by Nar. Manlius Boethius |
| Preceded by ? | Praetorian prefect of Italy; 486–493 | Succeeded by Liberius |
| Preceded by Q. Aurelius Memmius Symmachus | Urban prefect of Rome; 486 | Succeeded by Nar. Manlius Boethius II |
