= Liberius (praetorian prefect) =

5/6th-century Byzantine official

Petrus Marcellinus Felix Liberius

Praetorian Prefect of Italy
- In office 493–500
- Preceded by: Caecina Mavortius Basilius Decius
- Succeeded by: Caecina Decius Faustus Albinus

Praetorian Prefect of Gaul
- In office 510–536
- Preceded by: Polemius
- Succeeded by: Office abolished

Augustal Prefect of Egypt
- In office c. 538 – 542
- Preceded by: Rudun
- Succeeded by: Alexander

Personal details
- Born: c. 465 Liguria, Roman Italy
- Died: c. 554 (aged ~89) Ariminum, Roman Italy
- Spouse: Agretia
- Children: Venantius

Petrus Marcellinus Felix Liberius (c. 465 – c. 554) was a Late Roman aristocrat and official, whose career spanned seven decades in the highest offices of both the Ostrogothic Kingdom of Italy and the Eastern Roman Empire. He held the highest governmental offices of Italy, Gaul, and Egypt, "an accomplishment not often recorded – Caesar and Napoleon Bonaparte are the only parallels that come to mind!" as James O'Donnell observes in his biographical study of the man.

== Origins and family ==
The exact origin of Liberius is unknown, but it is speculated that he came from Liguria. He was from a senatorial family, though not one of the most prominent. He was married to an Agretia, who was possibly his second wife. He had at least two sons and a daughter. One of his sons, Venantius, was appointed consul in 507 and held the ceremonial office of comes domesticorum vacans some time later; nothing is known of his other children.

== Career under the Goths ==
=== Prefect of Italy ===
After the deposition of the last Western emperor, Romulus Augustus, by Odoacer in 476, the Roman administrative apparatus in Italy continued to function under the new regime. It continued to be staffed exclusively by Romans, and adhering to the pretense that Italy was still nominally a part of the Empire. Several senatorial families continued to serve in high administrative posts, and the young Liberius followed this tradition. Despite his youth he seems to have distinguished himself, for in 493, after Odoacer's murder, the new master of Italy, the Ostrogoth Theodoric the Great, appointed him to the highest civil office of praetorian prefect of Italy. He continued to serve in this capacity until 500, when he was retired and given the rank of patricius. His tenure was a success, as he proved capable in dealing with financial matters and in handling the sensitive issue of Gothic settlement, something reflected in the lavish praise he received from his contemporaries, Magnus Felix Ennodius and Cassiodorus.

=== Prefect of Gaul ===
In 508, Theodoric conquered the territory of Provence in southern Gaul, and in 510 decided to re-establish the defunct Praetorian prefecture of Gaul to administer the territory, with seat at Arelatum. Theodoric selected Liberius for the post, a sign of the king's trust in both his ability and his loyalty. Liberius served in that capacity until 536, when he returned to Italy, the longest such period on record for such a high office. Liberius' prime responsibility seems to have been the pacification of the new and war-torn province, a task he appears to have accomplished. In this he had the assistance of the local bishop, Caesarius. Sometime in the mid-520s, Liberius was stabbed in the abdomen with a spear during a Visigoth raid, and lay near death. The arrival of the bishop "miraculously" cured him, and a similar episode is recounted concerning his wife, Agretia. Possibly in a gesture of gratitude for his salvation, he built a new cathedral in Orange, where in 529 the Second Council of Orange was held; Liberius's signature appears first in the list of laymen endorsing the acts of the council. He also founded a monastery near Alatri, 60 km (40 mi) south of Rome: again, we may wonder whether this was a gesture of gratitude. This monastery has been identified with that of S. Sebastiano, still standing 3 km from Alatri. Upon the death of Theodoric in 526, he was given the title of patricius praesentalis, which O'Donnell notes "represents the only known case in the history of the Ostrogothic kingdom in which a Roman civilian was granted a significant military command." By 534, however, Liberius was back in Italy.

=== Embassy to Constantinople ===
At that time, the Ostrogothic Kingdom faced a succession dispute. After Theodoric's death, his grandson, Athalaric was crowned king. As he was only a child, his mother, Amalasuntha, assumed the regency. Her close relations to the Eastern Roman Emperor, Justinian, however, made her unpopular amongst the Gothic nobility. The young king, in the meantime, indulged in pleasures, which weakened his constitution, resulting in a premature death in October 534. Amalasuntha, trying to strengthen her position, appointed her cousin Theodahad as king. Theodahad however quickly deposed and imprisoned Amalasuntha, and executed her closest associates. Liberius, together with his fellow senator Venantius Opilio, was dispatched by Theodahad to Constantinople to inform Justinian, and carrying with them letters portraying a more mild version of events. However, upon reaching the port of Avlona, the two envoys met the emperor's own envoy, Peter, and told him what had really transpired. The news of Amalasuntha's captivity, followed by her subsequent murder, provided Justinian with a pretext for launching a campaign against the Goths in Italy, beginning the long and devastating Gothic War. Liberius was received with honour in Constantinople, and did not return to Italy.

== In Imperial service ==
=== Prefect of Egypt ===
Despite his advanced age, Liberius, due to his impeccably orthodox credentials, was chosen as the new Augustal Prefect of Egypt ca. 538, with the prime task of suppressing the local Monophysites, together with an ecclesiastical commission under the future Pope Pelagius. According to the information provided by Procopius in his Anecdota, his tenure in Egypt was troubled, both because of his lack of acquaintance with the local realities and because of interference from the Imperial court, including a dispute with his successor, John. On his return to Constantinople, in 542, Liberius faced a senatorial inquiry, but managed to defend his actions with success.

=== Role in the Gothic War ===
In Italy, the situation was deteriorating rapidly for the Empire. The Goths under Totila had recaptured most of the Italian peninsula and were threatening Sicily. In 550, after much vacillation on Justinian's behalf, Liberius was sent with an army to the island. He managed to enter the besieged city of Syracuse, but his military inexperience did not allow him to conduct any operations of significance against the Goths. Instead, he left the city with his army, and headed to Palermo, where in 551 he was replaced by the Armenian general Artabanes.

=== Final years ===
During that time, a civil war had broken out in the Visigothic Kingdom of Hispania (the Iberian Peninsula, comprising modern Spain and Portugal), between the supporters of Athanagild and Agila I. Athanagild asked Justinian for help, and the emperor sent a small army of 2,000 men to Hispania, which helped Athanagild prevail, and in 554 he was crowned King of the Visigoths. The Romans kept most of their possessions, roughly equal to the old province of Baetica, now the province of Spania, and the Visigoths acknowledged the suzerainty of the Empire. Jordanes, writing in 551, mentions in passing that this force is led by Liberius. A number of historians, including J. B. Bury, accept Jordanes' comment as accurate; however James O'Donnell notes that Liberius had returned to Constantinople after being replaced by Artabanes, and was there in May 553 when he took part in the Second Council of Constantinople, which would have left him no time for a campaign in Hispania. There he tried to persuade Pope Vigilius to attend the council and accept the Emperor's positions.

For his long and distinguished service to the Empire, Liberius was one of the men Justinian rewarded in the Pragmatic Sanction of 13 August 554, granting him extensive estates in Italy; O'Donnell notes this is the last document we have about Liberius' life written during his lifetime. Probably in the same year, Liberius died, and was buried in Ariminum. His children erected over his grave a funerary inscription which O'Donnell describes as "unexceptional, even trite: in complete accord with the most vacuous traditions of the genre."
