= Praetorian prefecture of Italy =

Administrative division of the late Roman Empire (337-584 CE)

Praetorian prefecture of Italy Praefectura praetorio Italiae
- Praetorian prefecture of the Roman Empire
- 337–584
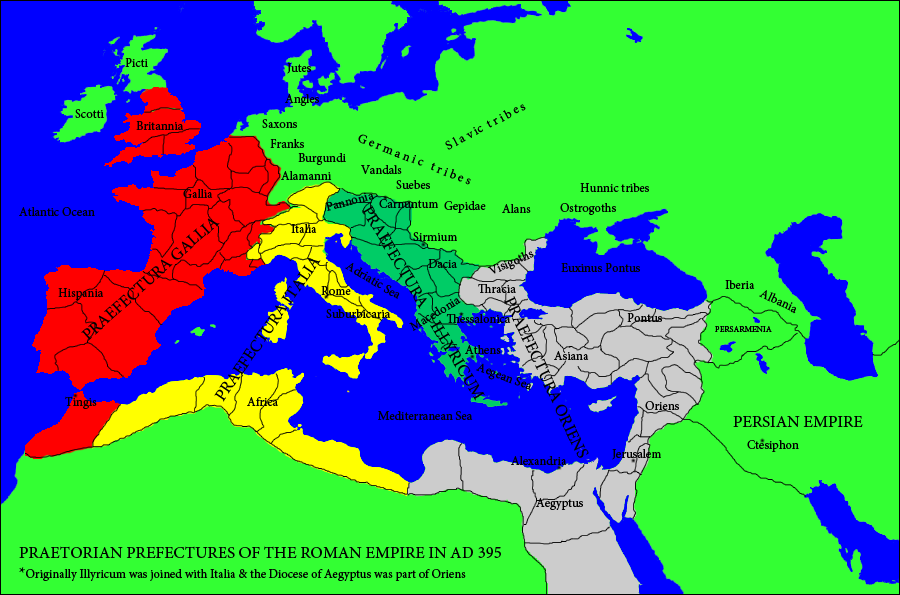
- Praetorian prefectures of the Roman Empire in 395
- Capital: Ravenna from 476
- Historical era: Late antiquity
  - Established: 337
  - Fall of the Western Roman Empire: 476
  - Ostrogothic conquest: 493
  - Start of Gothic War: 535
  - Lombard conquest: 568
  - Foundation of Exarchate of Ravenna: 584
Preceded by
Roman Italy
Succeeded by
Kingdom of Italy
Exarchate of Ravenna
Kingdom of the Lombards

The praetorian prefecture of Italy (Latin: Praefectura praetorio Italiae, in its full form (until 356) praefectura praetorio Italiae, Illyrici et Africae) was one of four praetorian prefectures into which the Late Roman Empire was divided since the first half of the 4th century. It comprised the Italian Peninsula, the western Balkans, the upper Danubian provinces and parts of North Africa. The Prefecture's seat moved from Rome to Milan and finally, Ravenna. It existed during the Later Roman Empire, and was part of the Western Roman Empire. The prefecture continued to function within Odoacer's and Ostrogothic kingdoms, and later within the Byzantine Empire, up to 584, when it was reorganized into the Exarchate of Ravenna.

Since most Latin terms and titles had their Greek equivalents, praetorian prefect of Italy was often titled as praetorian eparch of Italy (Greek: πραιτωριανός έπαρχος της Ιταλίας), and the praetorian prefecture itself was designated as praetorian eparchy (Greek: ἐπαρχότης τῶν πραιτωρίων).

== Structure and history ==
The prefecture was established in the division of the Empire after the death of Constantine the Great in 337, and was made up of dioceses. Initially these were the Diocese of Africa, the Diocese of Italy, the Diocese of Pannonia, the Diocese of Dacia and the Diocese of Macedonia (the last two were until c. 327 united in the Diocese of Moesia). Eventually the Diocese of Italy was split in two, the Diocese of Suburbicarian Italy (Italia suburbicaria: "Italy under the City", also referred to as "Diocese of the City of Rome") and the Diocese of Annonarian Italy (Italia annonaria: "provisioning Italy").

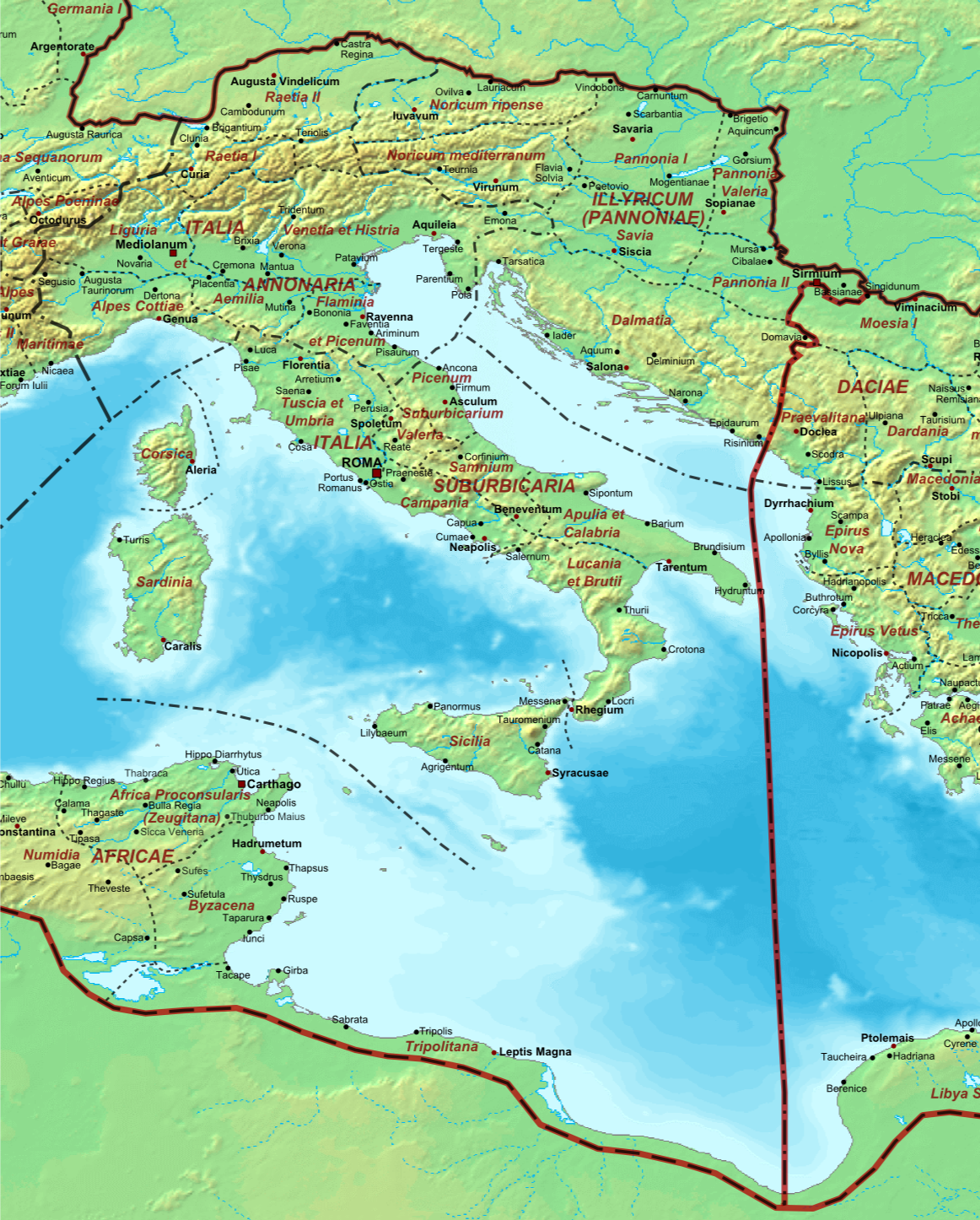
Roman Italy in 400

In 347, the praetorian prefecture of Illyricum was established, comprising the dioceses of Pannonia, Dacia and Macedonia. Vulcacius Rufinus was the prefect, 347–352. The new prefecture was abolished in 361 by Julian and reestablished in 375 by Gratian. Its territory was contested between the two halves of the Empire, until the final partition in 395, when the Diocese of Pannonia was split off from the Illyricum and joined to the Western Empire and the prefecture of Italy as the Diocese of Illyricum.

Despite the end of the Western Empire in 476, the Germanic successor states under Odoacer and Theodoric continued to use the Roman administrative machinery, as well as being nominal subjects of the Eastern emperor at Constantinople. The Prefecture thus survived, but with reduced territorial jurisdiction, confined to regions under Odoacer's or Ostrogothic rule.

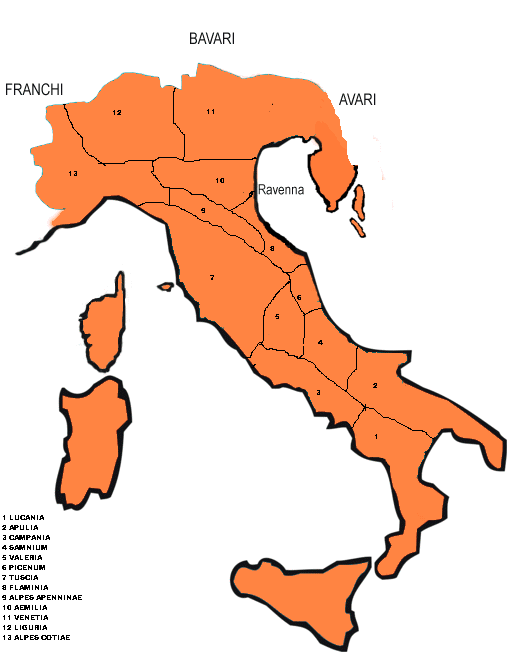
Praetorian prefecture of Italy: division at the beginning of the Byzantine rule, before the Lombard invasion in 568

During the Gothic War (535–554), entire Italy came under the Byzantine rule, and the Praetorian prefecture of Italy continued to exist, centered in Ravenna, and divided into provinces. However, with the Lombard invasion in 568, Byzantine rule became reduced to fragmented and increasingly isolated territories. Responding to that, remaining territories were grouped into several regions, or eparchies in 580 (Aemilia, Annonaria, Calabria, Campania, Urbicaria), but already by 584 the entire administrative structure was reorganized into the Exarchate of Italy, also centered in Ravenna, and headed by an imperial exarch of Italy, who was both civilian and military governor of Byzantine Italy.

Within the newly established Italian exarchate, praetorian prefects of Italy continue however to be attested, as heads of civilian branch of administration, until well into the 7th century. One of the last attested holders occurs in 639, and a couple of seals bearing the title eparchos ("prefect" in Greek) survive from the late 7th century, although it has been suggested that they are a misprint for exarchos ("exarch").

== List of known praefecti praetorio Italiae et Africae ==
- Aemilianus (328)
- Lucius Papius Pacatianus (334–335)
- Aconius Catullinus Philomathius (341)
- Marcus Maecius Memmius Furius Baburius Caecilianus Placidus (342–344)
- Vulcacius Rufinus (first time, 344–347)
- Gaius Ceionius Rufius Volusianus Lampadius (355)
- Taurus (356–361)
- Claudius Mamertinus (361–365)
- Vulcacius Rufinus (second time, 365–368)
- Sextus Claudius Petronius Probus (first time, c. 368–375)
- Decimius Hilarianus Hesperius (378–380)
- Afranius Syagrius (382)
- Flavius Hypatius (382–383)
- Sextus Claudius Petronius Probus (second time, 383)
- Nonius Atticus (383–384)
- Vettius Agorius Praetextatus (384)
- Neoterius (385)
- Sextus Claudius Petronius Probus (third time, 387)
- Virius Nicomachus Flavianus (390–392)

=== Western Empire ===
- Nummius Aemilianus Dexter (395)
- Eusebius (395–396)
- Mallius Theodorus (397–399)
- Valerius Messala Avienus (399–400)
- Rufus Synesius Hadrianus (400–405)
- Flavius Macrobius Longinianus (1st time, 406)
- Curtius (407–408)
- Flavius Macrobius Longinianus (2nd time, 408)
- Mallius Theodorus (408–409)
- Caecilianus (409)
- Jovius (409)
- Melitius (410–412)
- Seleucus (prefect for Africa, 412)
- Ioannes (412–413)
- Rufus Synesius Hadrianus (413–414)
- Seleucus (414–415)
- Junius Quartus Palladius (416–421)
- Anicius Auchenius Bassus (possibly, 426)
- Anicius Auchenius Bassus (435)
- Anicius Acilius Glabrio Faustus (c. 438)
- Petronius Maximus (439)
- Caecina Decius Aginatius Albinus (443–448)
- Caecina Decius Basilius (458)
- Caelius Aconius Probianus (461–463)
- Caecina Decius Basilius (463–465)
- Felix Himelco (473)

=== Germanic rule ===
Under Odoacer:

- Nar. Manlius Boethius (between 480 and 486) (he served as consul in 487)
- Caecina Decius Maximus Basilius (483) (he had served as consul in 480)
- Caecina Mavortius Basilius Decius (486–493) (he served as consul in 486)

Under the Ostrogoths:

- Liberius (494–500)
- Flavius Albinus (?500–503) (he had served as consul in 493)
- Cassiodorus the Elder (500–?)
- Anicius Probus Faustus iunior (509–512) (he had served as consul in 490)
- Rufius Magnus Faustus Avienus (527–528) (he had served as consul in 502)
- Faustus (521/522) or 529
- Cassiodorus the Younger (533–537) (he had served as consul in 514)
- Fidelis (537–538)
- Reparatus (538–539)

=== East Roman rule ===
- Athanasius (539–542)
- Maximinus (c. 542)
- Narses (554–568)
- Longinus (568–575)

== Sources ==
- Brown, Truesdell Sparhawk (1984). Gentlemen and Officers: Imperial Administration and Aristocratic Power in Byzantine Italy, A.D. 554-800. Rome: British School at Rome.
- Conti, Pier Maria (1975). L'Italia bizantina nella "Descriptio orbis Romani" di Giorgio Ciprio (in Italian). La Spezia: Accademia Lunigianese di Scienze "Giovanni Capellini".
- Cosentino, Salvatore, ed. (2021). A Companion to Byzantine Italy. Boston-Leiden: Brill.
- Diehl, Charles (1888). Études sur l’administration byzantine dans l’exarchat de Ravenne (568-751) (in French). Paris: Ernest Thorin.
- Martindale, John R., ed. (1980). The Prosopography of the Later Roman Empire: Volume II, AD 395–527. Cambridge: Cambridge University Press. ISBN 0-521-20159-4.
- Meyendorff, John (1989). Imperial unity and Christian divisions: The Church 450-680 A.D. Crestwood, NY: St. Vladimir's Seminary Press.
- Nesbitt, John W.; Oikonomides, Nicolas, eds. (1991). Catalogue of Byzantine Seals at Dumbarton Oaks and in the Fogg Museum of Art. Vol. 1. Washington: Dumbarton Oaks Research Library and Collection.
- Ostrogorsky, George (1956). History of the Byzantine State. Oxford: Basil Blackwell.
- Peters, Edward; Foulke, William D., eds. (2003) [1907]. Paul the Deacon: History of the Lombards. Philadelphia: University of Pennsylvania Press.
- Shlosser, Franziska E. (2003). "The Exarchates of Africa and Italy". Jahrbuch der Österreichischen Byzantinistik. 53: 27–45. Archived from the original on 2025-06-19.
- Várady, László (1969). Das Letzte Jahrhundert Pannoniens (376–476). Amsterdam: Verlag Adolf M. Hakkert.
- Wickham, Chris (1981). Early Medieval Italy: Central Power and Local Society, 400-1000. Totowa, NJ: Barnes & Noble.
- Wozniak, Frank E. (1981). "East Rome, Ravenna and Western Illyricum: 454-536 A.D." Historia: Zeitschrift für Alte Geschichte. 30 (3): 351–382.
