= Petronius Probinus (consul 489) =

Petronius Probinus was a Roman aristocrat during the reign of King Odoacer. He was the Western consul in 489 AD (with Flavius Eusebius as his Eastern colleague) and a prominent supporter of Antipope Laurentius. Probinus is believed to be the son of Rufius Achilius Maecius Placidus, consul in 481, and the father of Rufius Petronius Nicomachus Cethegus, consul in 504.

Political offices
Preceded by Claudius Iulius Ecclesius Dynamius, and Rufius Achilius Sividius	Consul of the Roman Empire; 489; With: Flavius Eusebius	Succeeded by Flavius Longinus, and Anicius Probus Faustus
