= Richard Delbrück =

German classical archaeologist

Richard Delbrück (German pronunciation: [ˈʁɪçaʁt ˈdɛl.bʁʏk]; 14 July 1875, Jena – 22 August 1957, Bonn) was a German classical archaeologist who specialized in the field of ancient Roman portraiture.

== Career ==
In 1899 he graduated from the University of Bonn, where he was a student of Georg Loeschcke. From 1911 to 1915, he was head of the Deutsches Archäologisches Institut (DAI) in Rome. He was later a professor of classical archaeology at the Universities of Giessen (1922–1928) and Bonn (1928–1940).

== Selected works ==
- Hellenistische bauten in Latium – Hellenistic buildings in Latium.
- Antike Porträts, 1912 – Classical portraiture.
- Bildnisse römischer kaiser, 1914 – Portraits of Roman emperors.
- Die Consulardiptychen und verwandte Denkmäler, 1926 – The consular diptych and related monuments.
- Antike porphyrwerke, 1932 – Ancient porphyry works.
- Spätantike Kaiserporträts von Constantinus Magnus bis zum Ende des Westreichs, 1933 – Late ancient Roman Imperial portraits: From Constantine Magnus until the end of the Western Roman Empire.
- Probleme der Lipsanothek in Brescia, 1952 – treatise on the Lipsanotheca of Brescia.
