= Longinus (consul 486) =

Longinus (Greek: Λογγῖνος; fl. 475–491) was a politician of the Eastern Roman Empire, brother of Emperor Zeno and twice consul (in 486 and 490).

== Biography ==
Longinus came from the region of Isauria, in Asia Minor. His father was called Kodisa (as attested by his brother's patronimic "Tarasicodissa"), his mother was Lallis or Lalis, his wife was a Valeria and he had a daughter called Longina.

When his brother, the Emperor Zeno, was deposed by Basiliscus and pursued by the Imperial army in Isauria (475), Longinus was captured by the Isaurian general Illus and held prisoner for a decade. Illus, who had been a supporter of Basiliscus but later had passed to Zeno's side, used Longinus to keep Zeno under control. In 483, when Zeno requested Longinus's liberation, Illus refused and started the rebellion that led to his death.

On the death of Zeno in 491, Longinus was one of the possible candidates for the succession, but his Isaurian origin, which had already caused problems to Zeno, disadvantaged him: Ariadne, Zeno's widow, chose Anastasius I, a senior official.

Once Anastasius became emperor, Longinus and prominent Isaurian officials were exiled. According to some sources, Anastasius forced him to take vows and sent him into exile in Thebaid (Egypt). Longinus's mother, wife and daughter were exiled to Bithynia where they were forced to survive on the charity of others.

The supporters of Longinus and other Isaurian discontents then instigated a revolt in Isauria. Anastasius's forces defeated the rebel army (492) led by Longinus of Cardala and finally suppressed the revolt six years later, with the death of the last leader of the rebels, Longinus of Selinus. Soon afterwards, Longinus died, possibly of starvation.

== Bibliography ==
- Evagrius Scholasticus, The Ecclesiastical History of Evagrius Scholasticus, trad. di Michael Whitby, Liverpool University Press, 2001, ISBN 0-85323-605-4, pp. 163–165.
- Eiddon, Iorwerth, e Stephen Edwards, The Cambridge Ancient History, Cambridge University Press, 2005, ISBN 0-521-32591-9, pp. 52–53, 477.
- Haarer, Fiona (2006). Anastasius I: Politics and Empire in the Late Roman World. Francis Cairns.
- Martindale, John R.; Jones, A. H. M.; Morris, John, eds. (1971). "Fl. Longinus 6". The Prosopography of the Later Roman Empire: Volume I, AD 260–395. Cambridge: Cambridge University Press. p. 689. ISBN 0-521-07233-6.

Political offices
Preceded by Quintus Aurelius Memmius Symmachus	Consul of the Roman Empire; 486 with Caecina Mavortius Basilius Decius	Succeeded by Manlius Boethius
Preceded by Petronius Probinus, Eusebius	Consul of the Roman Empire; 490 with Anicius Probus Faustus Junior	Succeeded by Anicius Olybrius
