= Claudius Julius Ecclesius Dynamius =

Claudius Julius Ecclesius Dynamius (Latin: Claudius Iulius Ecclesius Dynamius) was a Roman senator during the late 5th-century who became consul in 488 and Urban prefect of Rome in 490 under Theodoric.

Ecclesius is known to have issued an edict, de fraudibus molendinariorum, which outlines the proper use of mills near Janiculum. He had public scales prepared in order to weigh the sacks of flour before and after the milling operation and fixes the millers' wages to three nummi per bushel.

== Sources ==
- Henri Alexandre Wallon, Histoire de l'esclavage dans l'antiquité, Volume 3 pp. 526–527
- Corsinus, Eduardus (1766), Series Praefectorum Urbis (in Latin), p. 363

Preceded by Nar. Manlius Boethius, post consulatum Longini (East)	Consul of the Roman Empire; 488; With: Rufius Achilius Sividius	Succeeded by Petronius Probinus, Flavius Eusebius
