= Quintus Aurelius Memmius Symmachus =

Roman historian and politician (d. 526)

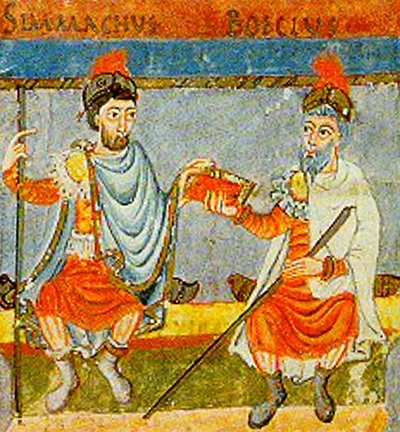
- Symmachus (left) and Boethius, presentation miniature, Boethius, De institutione arithmetica, c. 845

Western Roman Consul
- In office 485–485
- Monarch: Theodoric
- Preceded by: Decius Marius Venantius Basilius
- Succeeded by: Caecina Mavortius Basilius Decius

Personal details
- Died: 526
- Relations: Symmachi
- Children: Rusticiana, Galla, Proba, Boethius (adopted)
- Parent: Quintus Aurelius Symmachus
- Profession: Historian, patron

Quintus Aurelius Memmius Symmachus (died 526) was a 6th-century Roman aristocrat, a historian and a supporter of Nicene Christianity. He was a patron of secular learning, and became the consul for the year 485. He supported Pope Symmachus in the schism over that Pope's election, and was executed with his son-in-law Boethius after being charged with treason.

== Biography ==
He belonged to the Symmachi, one of the richest and most influential senatorial families in Rome; his father, Quintus Aurelius Symmachus, had been consul in 446. The family emphasised their status as members of the traditional Roman senatorial aristocracy. One manifestation of this is that Mummius Symmachus is the last attested individual to have borne a praenomen, the first element of the traditional Roman name. Memmius Symmachus had three daughters (Rusticiana, Galla and Proba) and adopted the young Anicius Manlius Severinus Boethius when his father died; later Boethius married Rusticiana, and the couple had two sons, Symmachus and Boethius, both consuls in 522. Memmius Symmachus' civil offices included being appointed sole consul for 485, the third known member of his family to hold this office.

Although Symmachus was the head of a family with a long connection with Pagan tradition—his grandfather Quintus Aurelius Symmachus delivered a famous speech urging the return of the Altar of Victory to the Roman Senate House—he was an ardent Christian, interested both in theological disputes and, more prosaically, in the struggles for the control of the Pope. During and after the disputed election of Pope Symmachus (who was apparently not related to him), he and Anicius Probus Faustus Niger were the only two senators known to support the pope against his more popular rival, Laurentius.

Symmachus cultivated the ancient Roman culture, writing a Roman history in seven volumes; this work has been lost except for a section quoted by Jordanes in his Getica. Symmachus' wealth enabled his patronage: he was involved in publication of the Commentarii in Somnium Scipionis by Macrobius Ambrosius Theodosius, and there is even a copy of the work corrected by his hand.

For the most part, Symmachus maintained good relationships with the new rulers of Italy—both Odovacer and Theodoric the Great—demonstrated by his appointment as praefectus urbi between 476 and 491, consul in 485, patricius within 510, and even reaching the influential rank of caput senatus (president of the Senate). His visit to Constantinople, after which Priscian dedicated him some poems, was likely on behalf of king Theodoric. However, Symmachus contradicted the Ostrogothic king, who condemned him to death for treason in 526, one year after the execution of Boethius.

== See also ==
- Pope Symmachus

== Notes ==
Political offices
Preceded by Decius Marius Venantius Basilius, Flavius Theodericus	Consul of the Roman Empire; 485	Succeeded by Caecina Mavortius Basilius Decius Iunior, Flavius Longinus
