= Basilica of San Vitale =

Minor basilica in Ravenna, Italy

Church of San Vitale
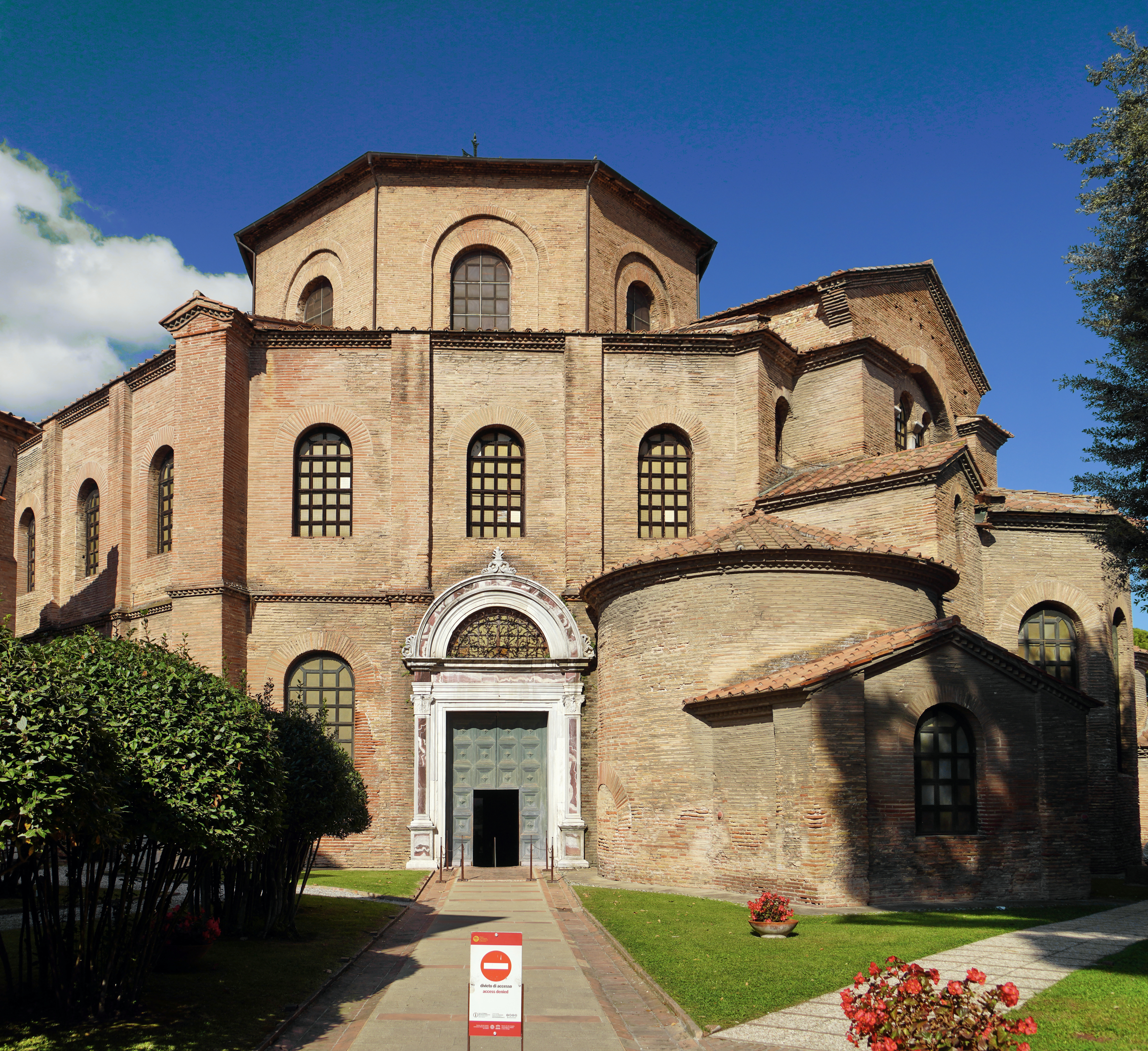
- The Church of San Vitale

- Location within Italy

Religion
- Affiliation: Roman Catholic
- Province: Archdiocese of Ravenna-Cervia
- Region: Emilia-Romagna
- Year consecrated: 547

Location
- Location: Ravenna, Italy
- Coordinates: 44°25′14″N 12°11′47″E

Architecture
- Style: Byzantine
- Groundbreaking: 527
- Completed: 547
- Construction cost: 26,000 solidi

Website
- http://www.ravennamosaici.it/

UNESCO World Heritage Site
- Official name: Church of St. Vitale
- Part of: Early Christian Monuments of Ravenna
- Criteria: Cultural: (i), (ii), (iii), (iv)
- Reference: 788-002
- Inscription: 1996 (20th Session)
- Area: 0.14 ha (0.35 acres)

The Basilica of San Vitale is a late antique church in Ravenna, Italy. The sixth-century church is an important surviving example of early Byzantine art and architecture, and its mosaics in particular are some of the most-studied works in Byzantine art. It is one of eight structures in Ravenna inscribed in the UNESCO World Heritage List. Its foundational inscription describes the church as a basilica, though its centrally-planned design is not typical of the basilica form. Within the Roman Catholic Church it holds the honorific title of basilica for its historic and ecclesial importance.

== History ==
The church's construction began in 526 on the orders of Bishop Ecclesius of Ravenna. At the time, Ravenna was under the rule of the Ostrogoths. Bishop Maximian completed its construction in 547, following the conquest of Italy by Justinian I.

The construction of the church was sponsored by local banker and architect Julius Argentarius. Very little is known of Julius, but he also sponsored the construction of the nearby Basilica of Sant'Apollinare in Classe at around the same time. A donor portrait of Julius Argentarius may appear among the courtiers on the Justinian mosaic. The final cost amounted to 26,000 solidi equal to 16.38 kg (36.11 lb) of gold. It has been suggested that Julius originated from the eastern part of the Byzantine Empire, where there was a long-standing tradition of public benefactions.

The central vault used a western technique of hollow tubes inserted into each other, rather than bricks. This method was the first recorded structural use of terracotta forms, which later evolved into modern structural clay tile. The ambulatory and gallery were vaulted only later in the Middle Ages.

The Baroque frescoes on the dome were painted between 1778 and 1782 by Serafino Barozzi [it], Ubaldo Gandolfi, and Jacopo Guarana.

== Architecture ==
The main building of the church is laid out octagonally. The building combines Roman and Byzantine elements. The dome, shape of doorways, and stepped towers are typical of Roman style, while the polygonal apse, capitals, narrow bricks, and an early example of flying buttresses are typical of the Byzantine. The church is most famous for its wealth of Byzantine mosaics, the largest and best-preserved specimens outside of Istanbul. San Vitale is of extreme importance in Byzantine art, as it is the only major church from the period of the Emperor Justinian I to survive virtually intact. Like the Church of Saints Sergios and Bacchos in Constantinople, its overall design is a "double-shelled octagon."

Some speculate that it reflects the design of the Byzantine Imperial Palace Audience Chamber, of which nothing at all survives. The bell tower has four bells. The tenor bell dates to the 16th century. According to legends, the church was erected on the site of the martyrdom of Saint Vitalis. However, there is some confusion as to whether this is the Saint Vitalis of Milan, or the Saint Vitale, whose body was discovered (together with that of Saint Agricola) by Saint Ambrose in Bologna in 393.

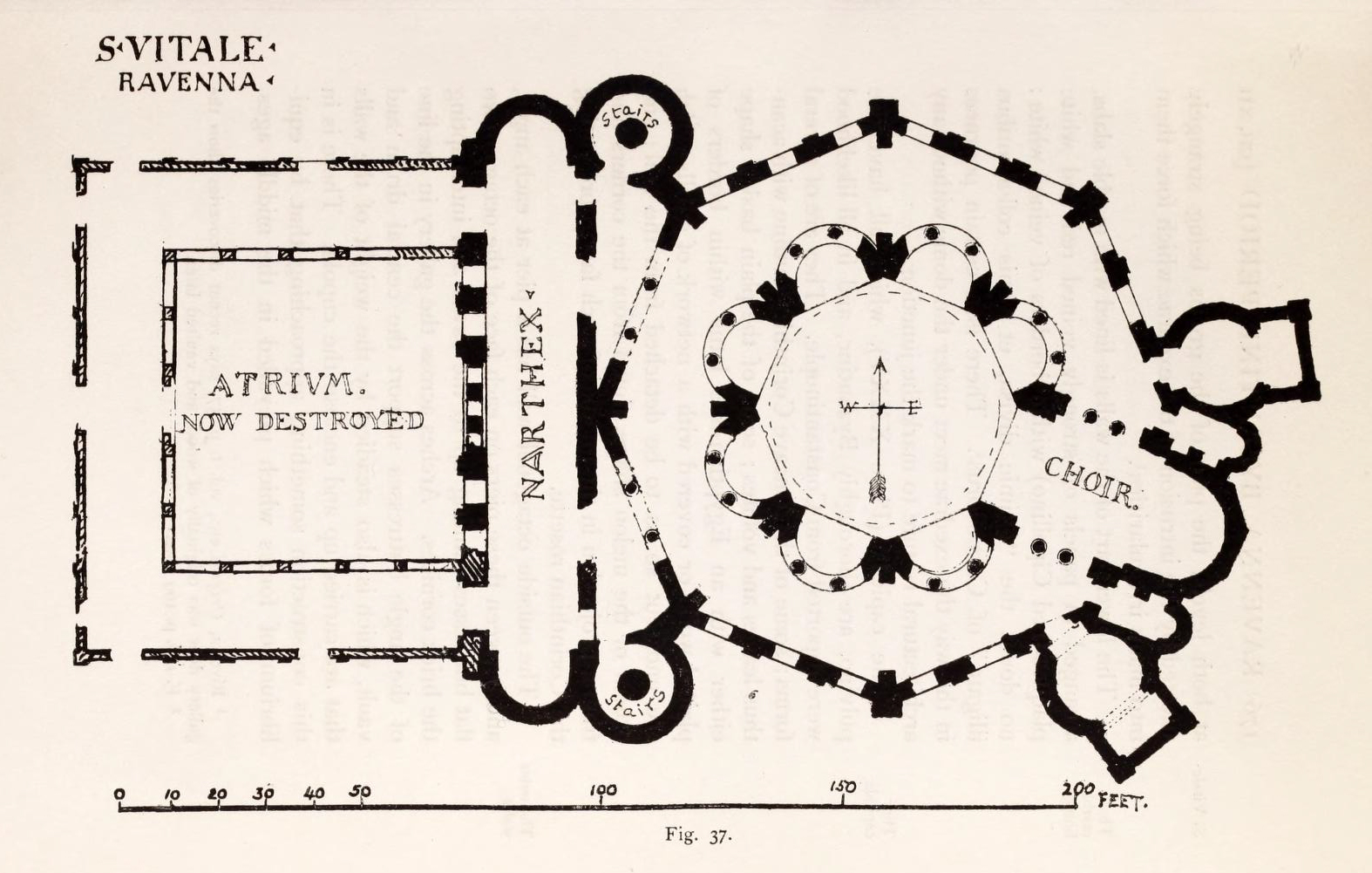
Layout of San Vitale (Jackson 1913)

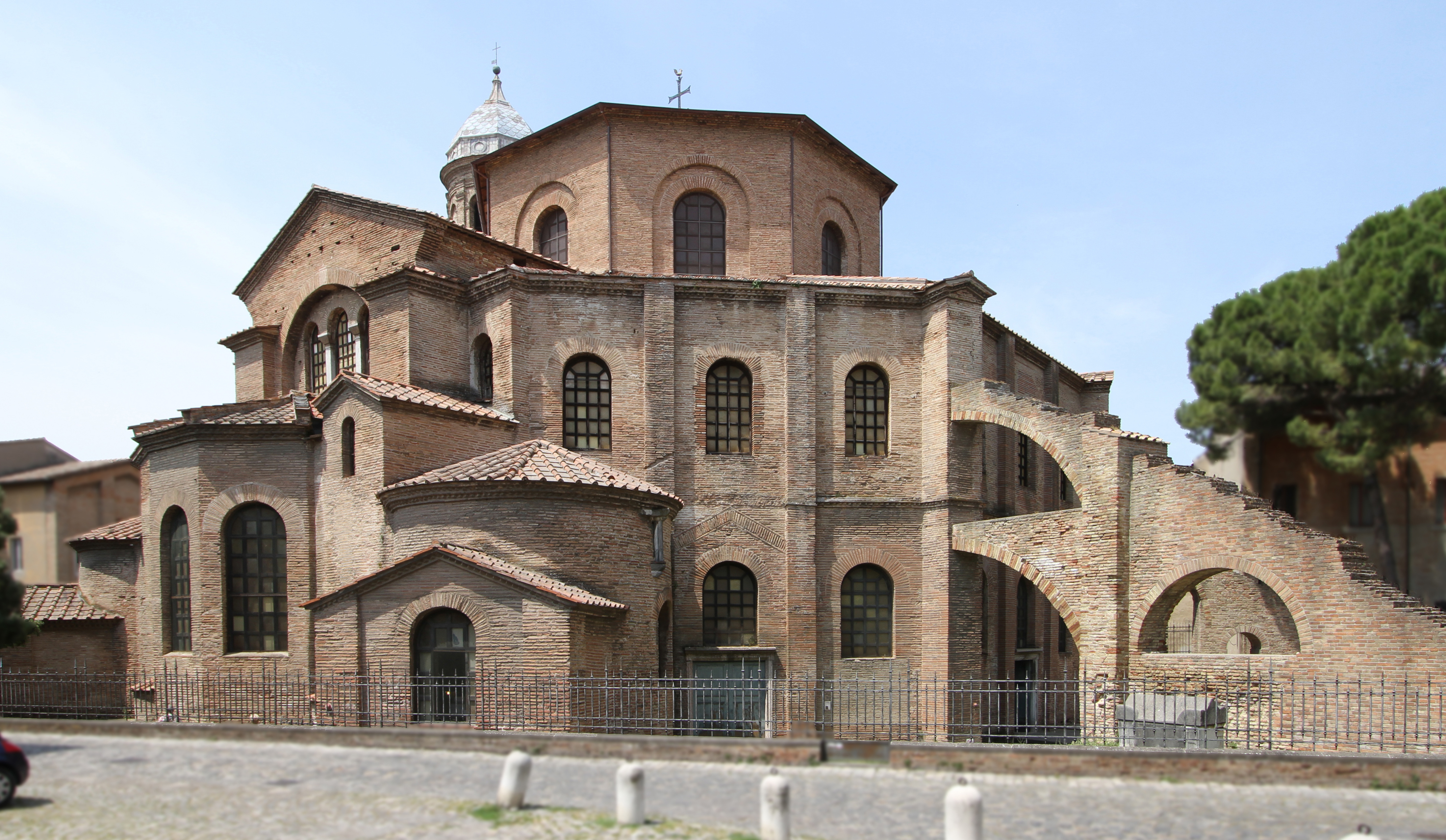
Exterior view of St. Vitale

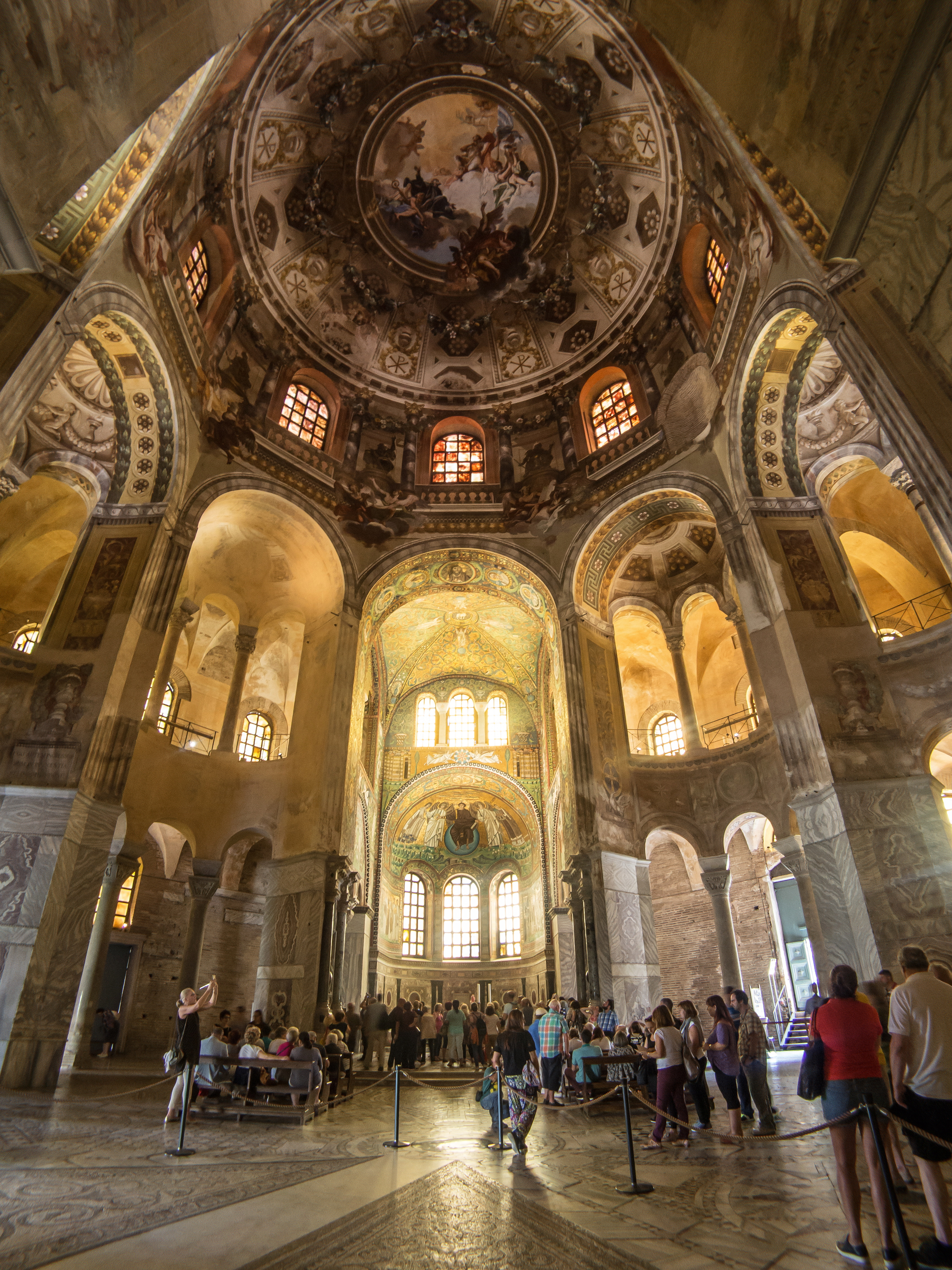
Southeast view

== Mosaic art ==
The central section is surrounded by two superposed ambulatories. The upper one, the matrimoneum, was possibly reserved for married women. A series of mosaics in the lunettes above the triforia depict sacrifices from the Old Testament: the Hospitality of Abraham (Genesis 18:1–16), and the Sacrifice of Isaac; the story of Moses and the Burning Bush, Jeremiah and Isaiah, representatives of the Twelve Tribes of Israel, and the story of Abel and Cain. A pair of angels, holding a medallion with a cross, crowns each lunette. On the side walls the corners, next to the mullioned windows, have mosaics of the Four Evangelists, under their symbols (angel, lion, ox and eagle), and dressed in white. Especially the portrayal of the lion is remarkable in its ferocity.

The cross-ribbed vault in the presbytery is richly ornamented with mosaic festoons of leaves, fruit, and flowers, converging on a crown encircling the Lamb of God. The crown is supported by four angels, and every surface is covered with a profusion of flowers, stars, birds and animals, including many peacocks. Above the arch, on both sides, two angels hold a disc and beside them a representation of the cities of Jerusalem and Bethlehem. They symbolise the human race (Jerusalem representing the Jews, and Bethlehem the Gentiles). The images are based on the interaction between the heavenly and the earthly subjects of God.

All these mosaics are executed in the Hellenistic-Roman tradition: lively and imaginative, with rich colours and a certain perspective, and with a vivid depiction of the landscape, plants, and birds. The polychrome colours and shapes, as well as the preference for geometric pattern over representation is known as the jewelled style in Late Antiquity. They were finished when Ravenna was still under Gothic rule. The apse is flanked by two chapels, the prothesis and the diaconicon, typical for Byzantine architecture.

Inside, the intrados of the great triumphal arch is decorated with fifteen mosaic medallions, depicting Jesus Christ, the Twelve Apostles, and Saints Gervasius and Protasius, the sons of Saint Vitale. The theophany was begun in 525 under bishop Ecclesius. It has a great gold fascia with twining flowers, birds, and horns of plenty.

The apse mosaic centres on a youthful depiction of Jesus Christ, seated on a blue globe, robed in purple, flanked by angels, offering with his right hand the martyr's crown to Saint Vitale, while on his left Bishop Ecclesius offers a model of the church, in his role as the symbolic donor of the church.

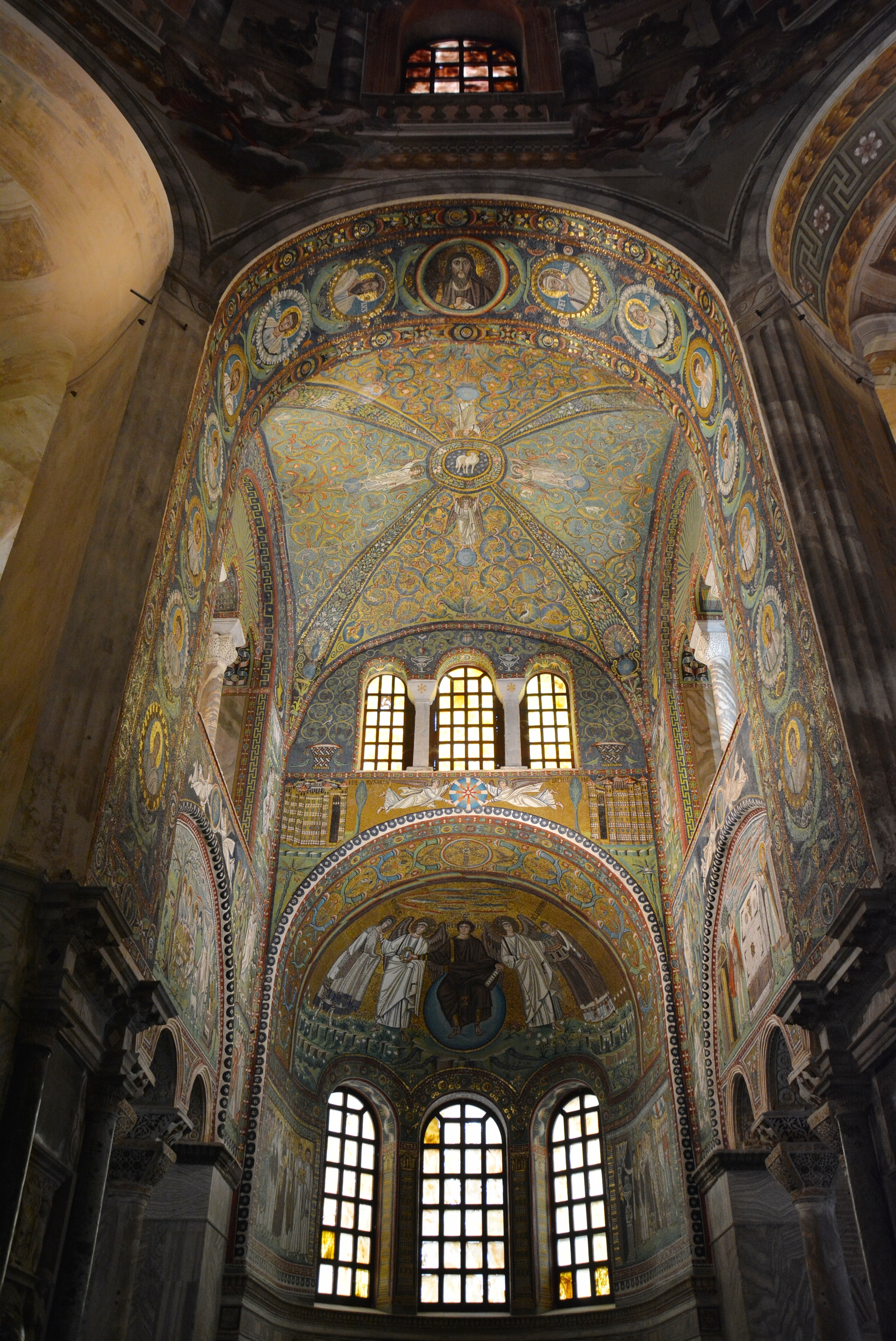
The mosaics in the presbytery

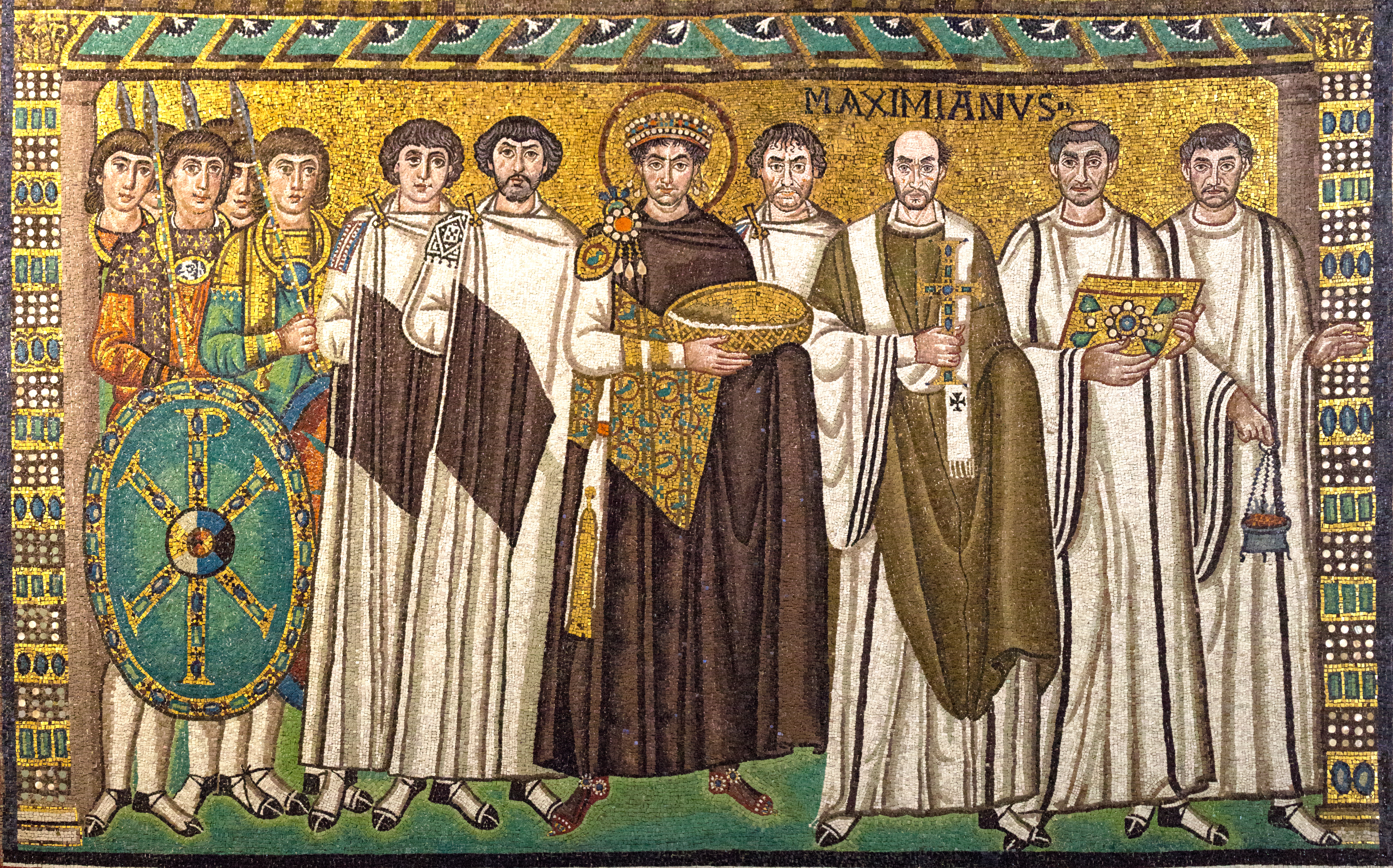
Emperor Justinian I with his retinue and Bishop Maximian

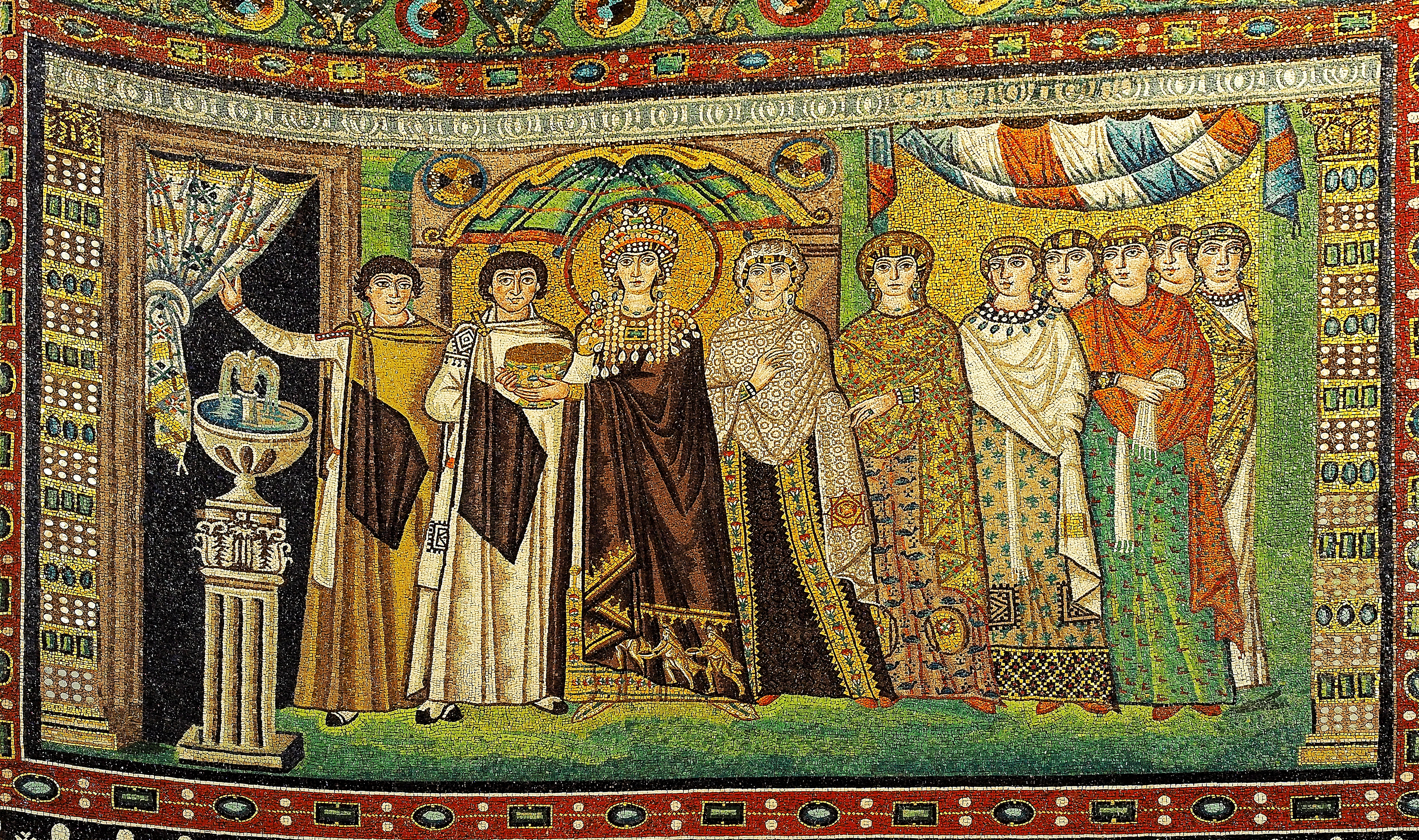
Mosaic of Theodora and attendants

=== Justinian and Theodora panels ===
At the foot of the apse side walls are two famous mosaic panels, completed in 547. On viewer left (but privileged right side from perspective of Christ in apse) is a mosaic depicting the East Roman Emperor Justinian I, clad in Tyrian purple with a golden halo, standing next to court officials, generals Belisarius and Narses, Bishop Maximian, palatinae guards, and deacons. The halo around his head gives him the same aspect as Christ in the dome of the apse, but is part of the tradition of rendering the imperial family with haloes described by Ernst Kantorowicz in The King's Two Bodies. Justinian himself stands in the middle, with soldiers on his right and clergy on his left, emphasising that Justinian is the leader of both church and state of his empire. The later insertion of Bishop Maximian's name above his head suggests that the mosaic may have been modified in 547, replacing the representation of Victor, Bishop of Ravenna with that of Maximian's.

The gold background of the mosaic perhaps shows that Justinian and his entourage are inside the church. The figures are placed in a V shape; Justinian is placed in the front and in the middle to show his importance with Bishop Maximian on his left and lesser individuals being placed behind them. This placement can be seen through the overlapping feet of the individuals present in the mosaic.

On the opposite wall, the more elaborate panel shows Empress Theodora solemn and formal, with a golden halo, crown and jewels, and a group of court women as well as eunuchs. The two women standing beside Theodora are traditionally identified as Antonina, the wife of Belisarius, and their daughter Ioannina. The Empress holds the Eucharistic vessel for the Precious Blood, and her panel differs from that of Justinian in having a more complex background, with a fountain, cupola, and lavish hangings. They are adorned with intricately patterned textiles, possibly luxurious silks imported from the Sassanian Persian Empire. One scholar has argued that Theodora was depicted after her death in 548, but that theory has not been widely accepted due to other evidence that the mosaics were completed by 547 when the church was consecrated. This is the only certain image of the Empress Theodora, and stands in contrast to her depiction in some of the political rhetoric of the era.

== Gallery ==
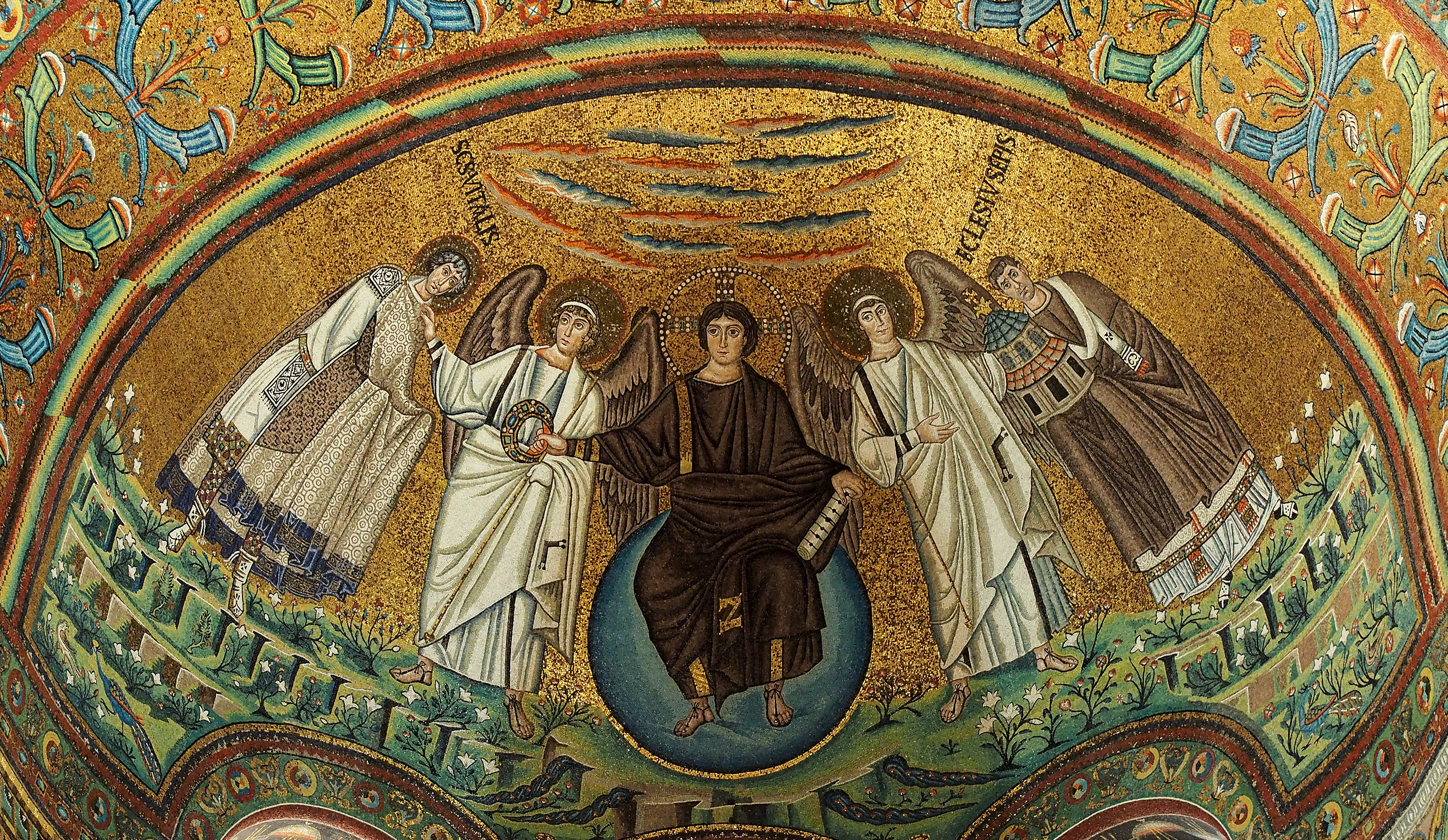
Mosaic in the semi-dome of the apse: Christ Pantocrator with St. Vitalis, two archangels and bishop Ecclesius.

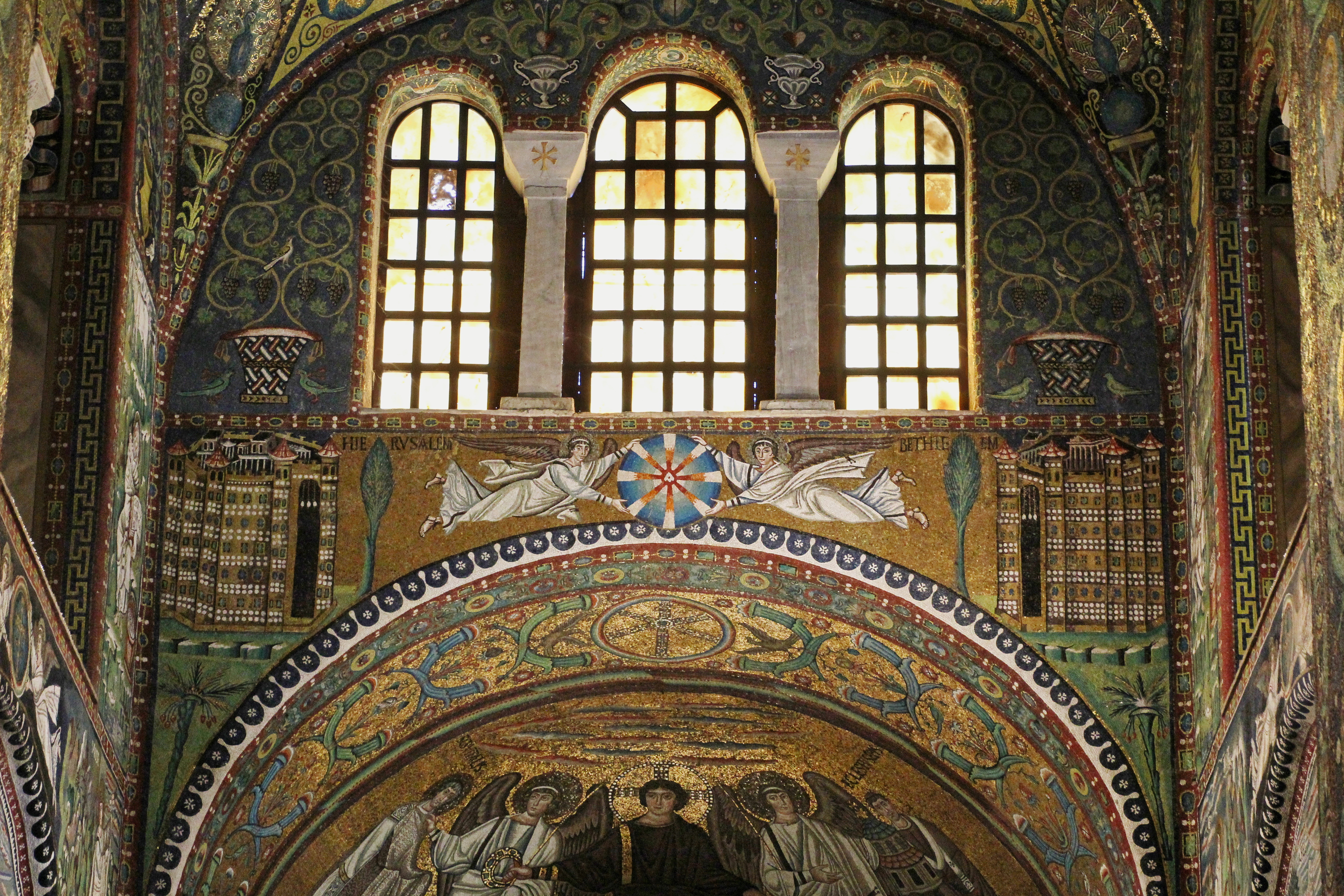
New Jerusalem and Bethlehem on the left and right of two angels holding a star with an Alpha in its centre (wall above the apse)

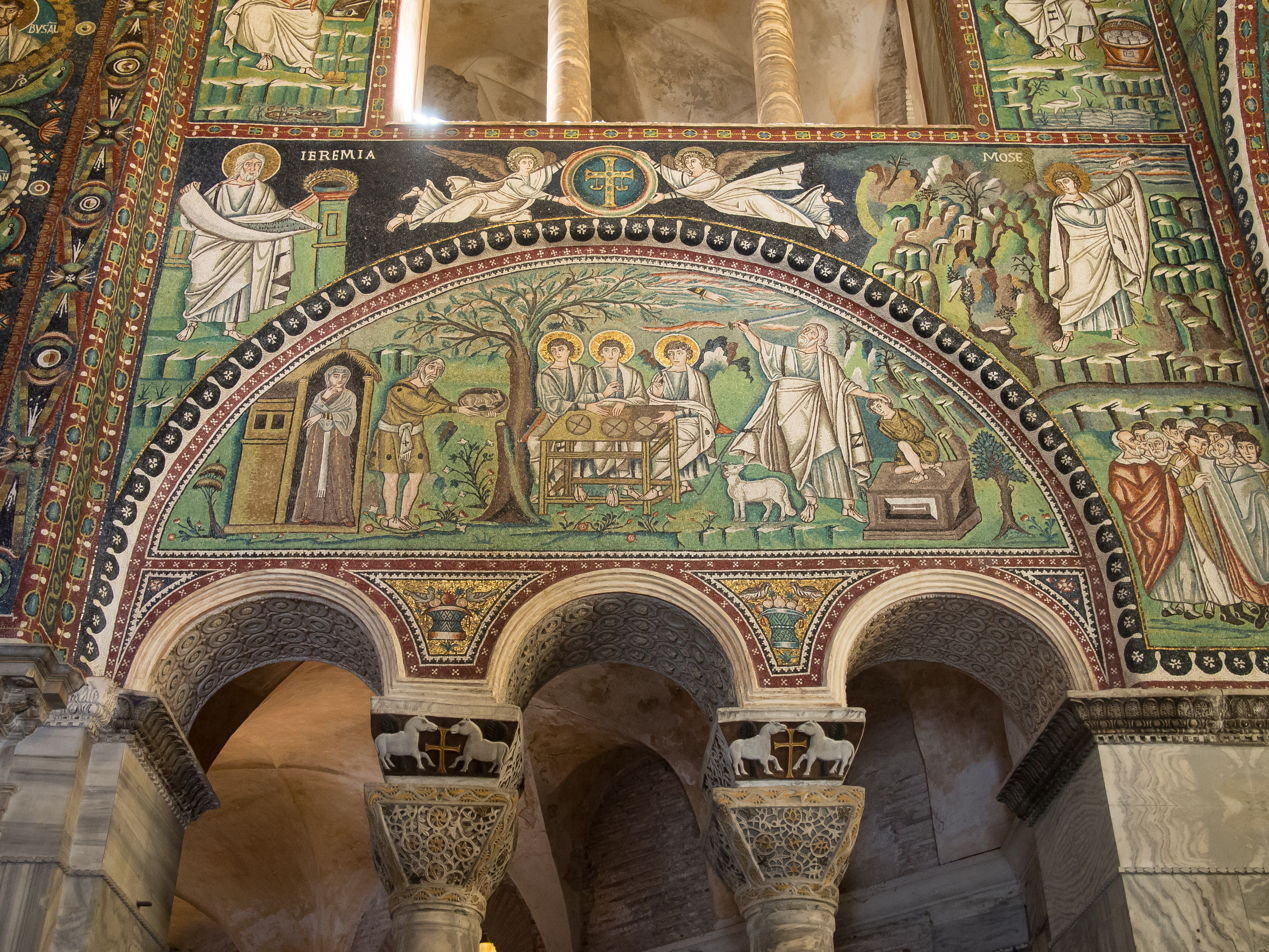
The Hospitality of Abraham and the Sacrifice of Isaac

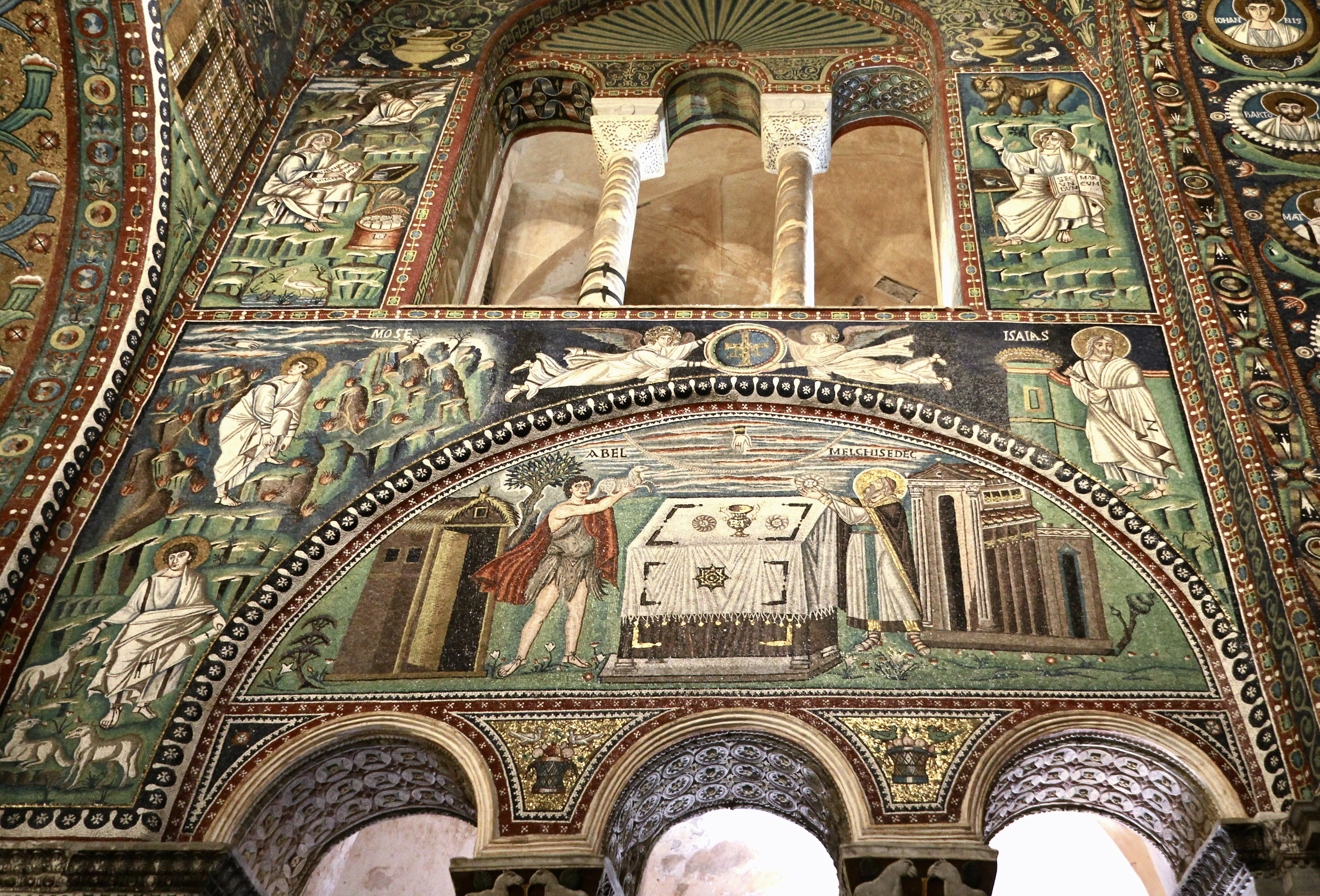
The Sacrifice of Abel and Melchizedek

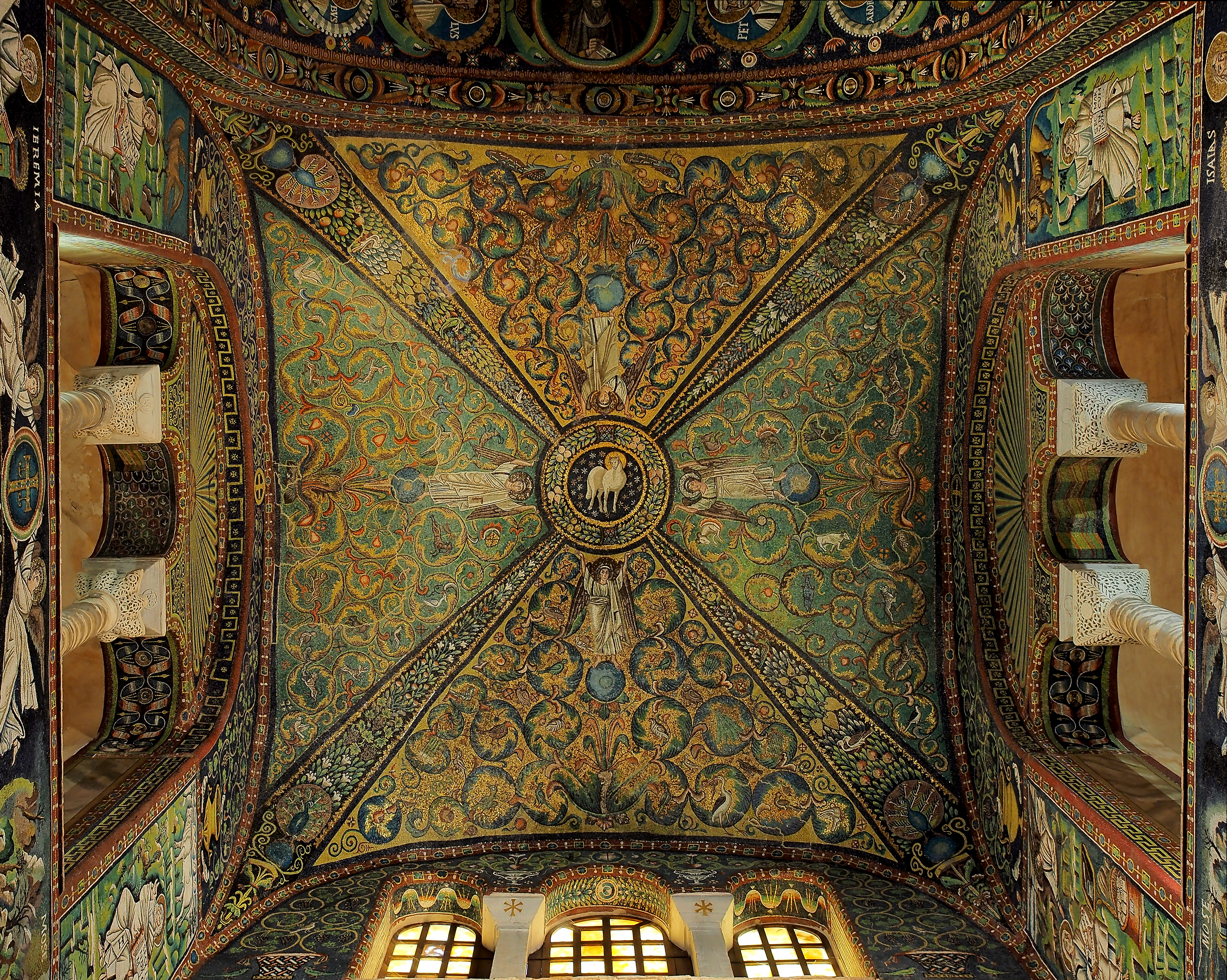
Ceiling mosaic above the presbytery with the Lamb of God in its centre

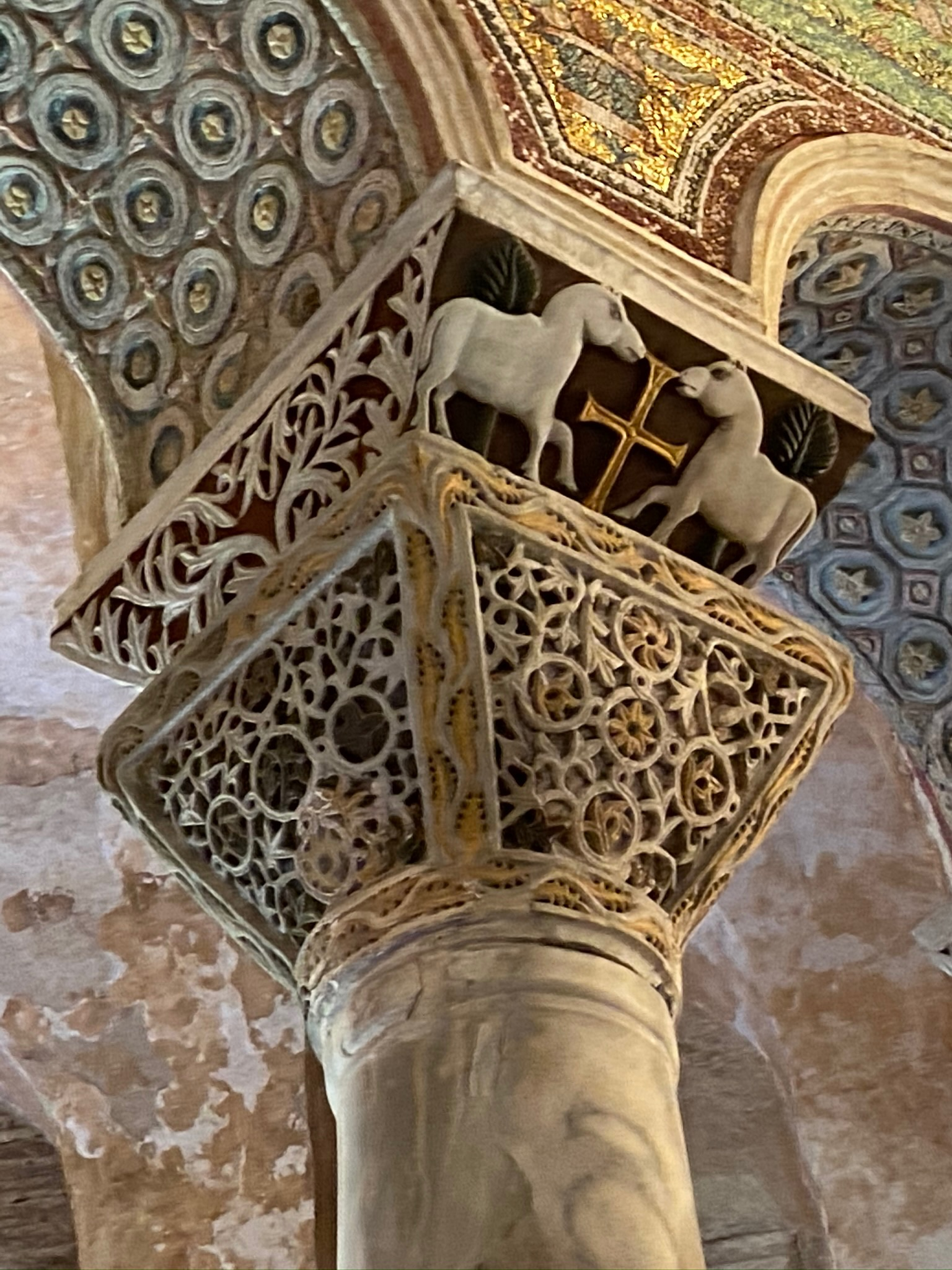
Detail of a capital in the choir

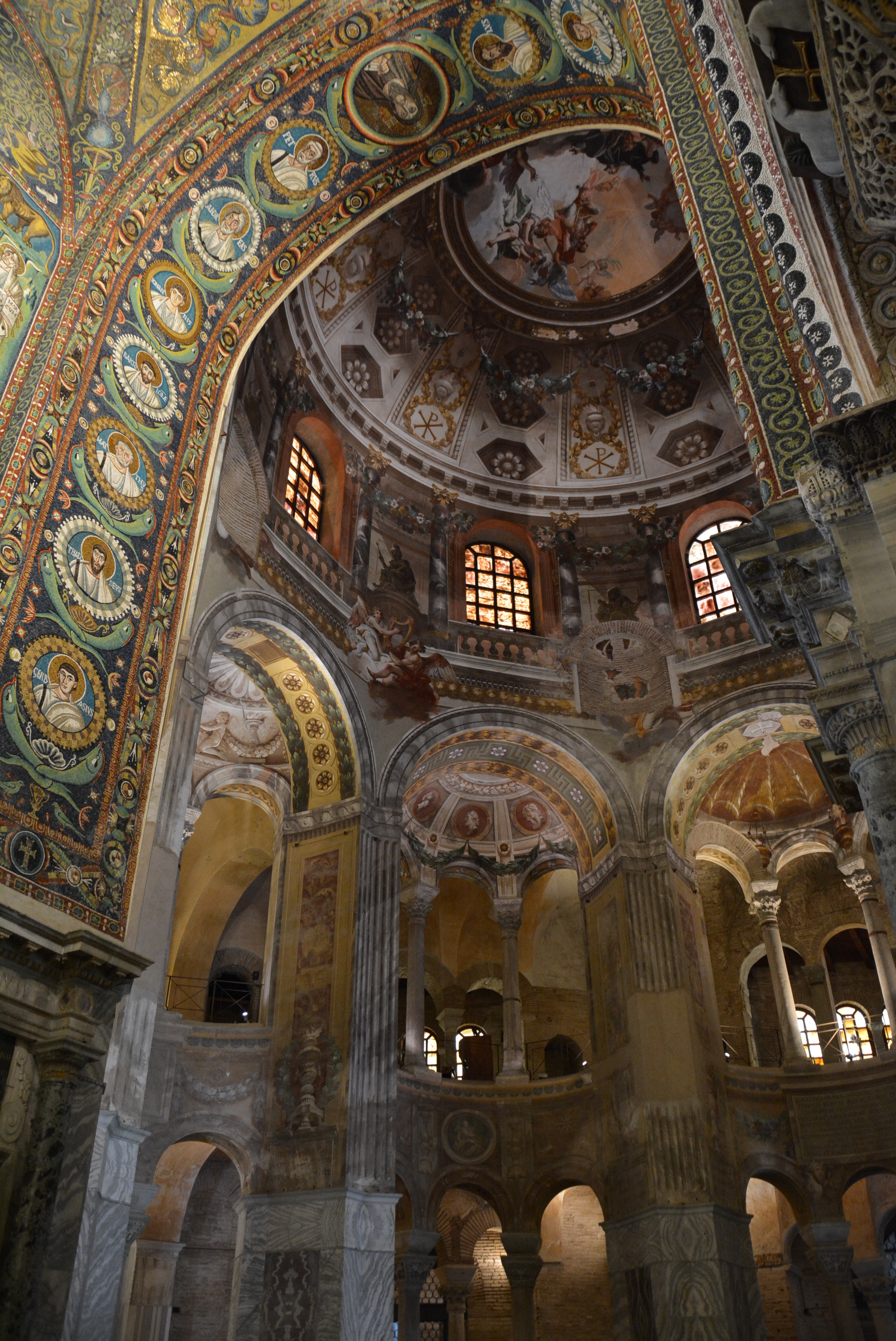
Triumphal arch mosaics of Jesus Christ and the Apostles

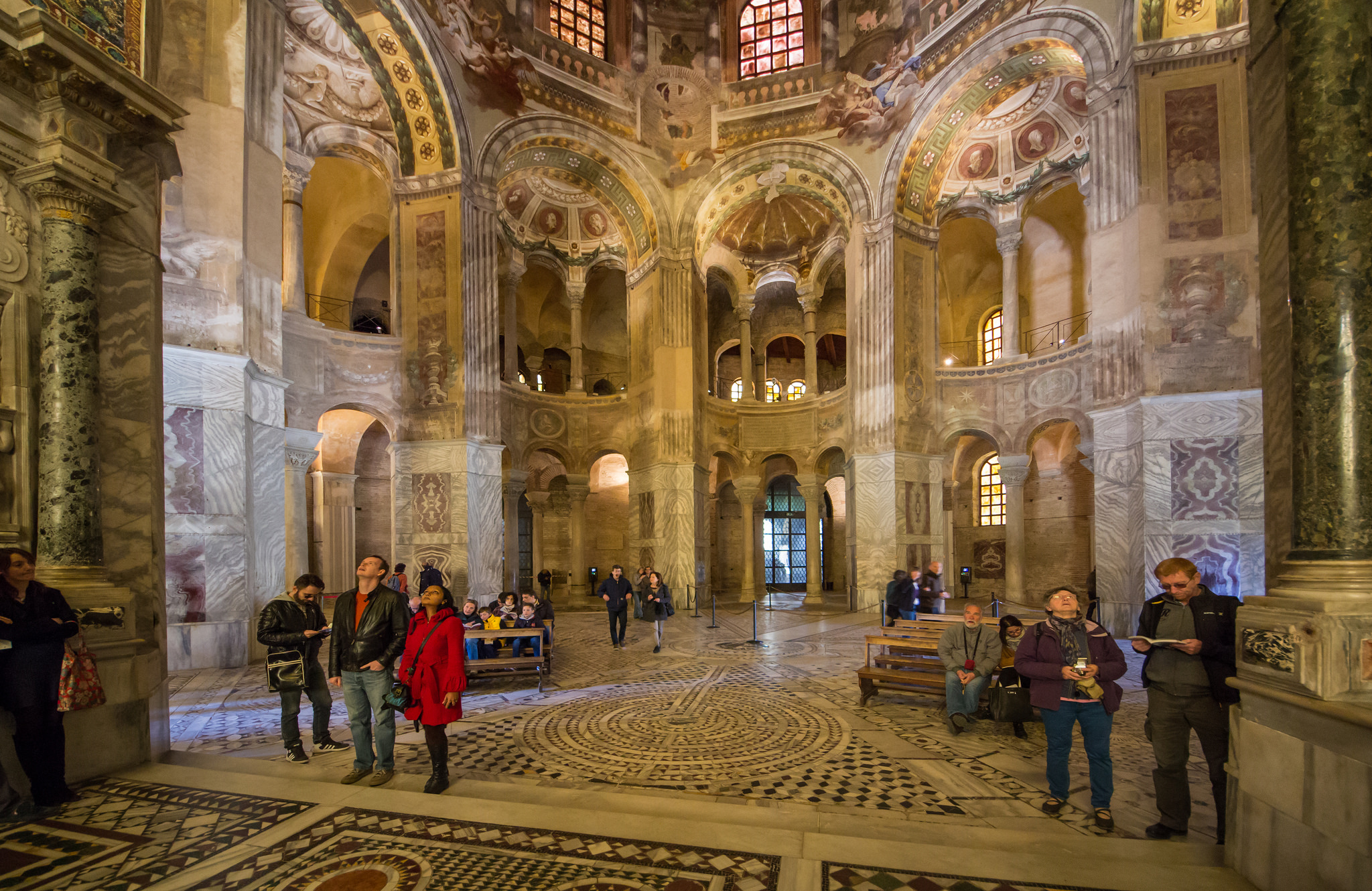
The interior of San Vitale

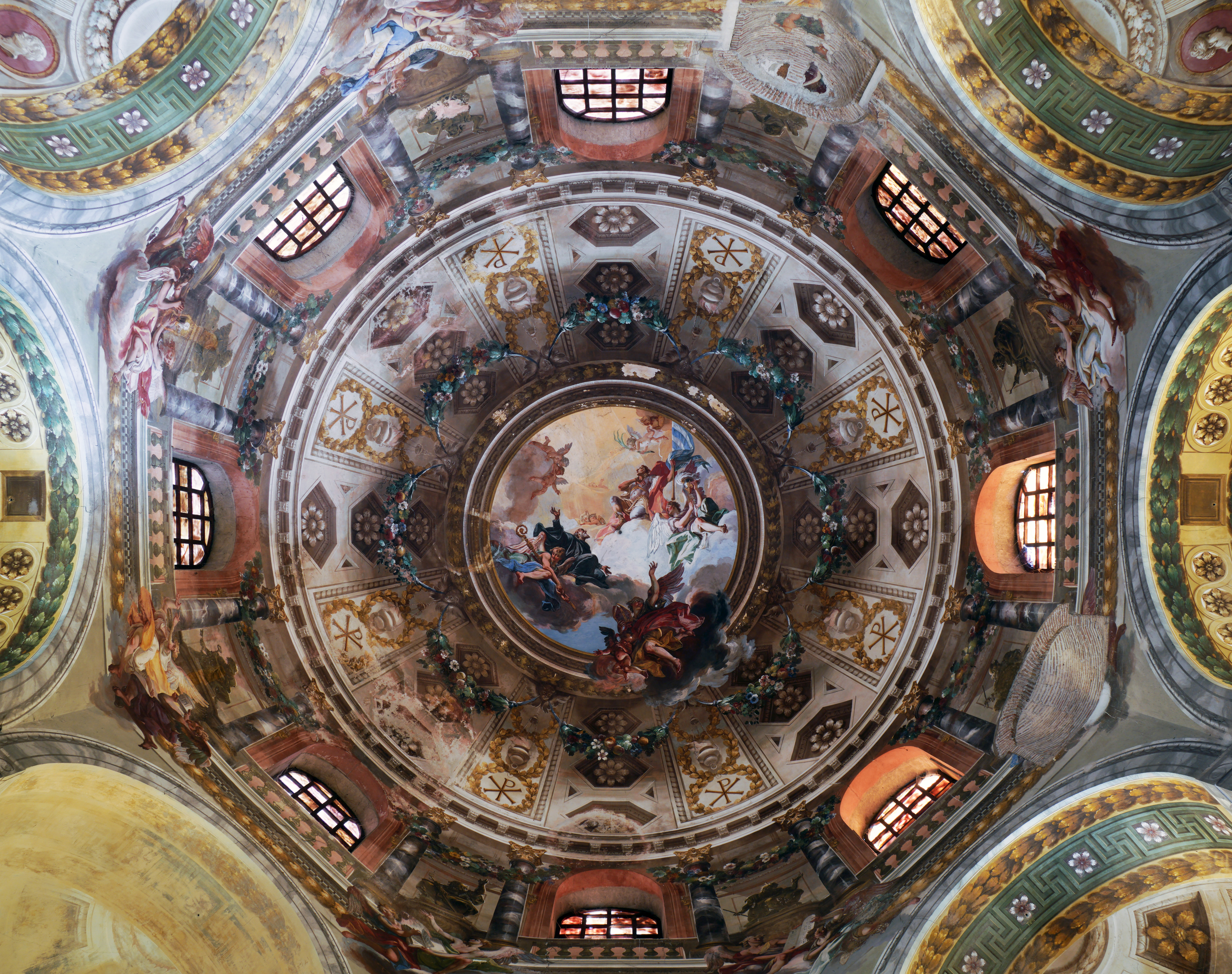
The interior of the dome, with Baroque frescoes from the late 18th century.

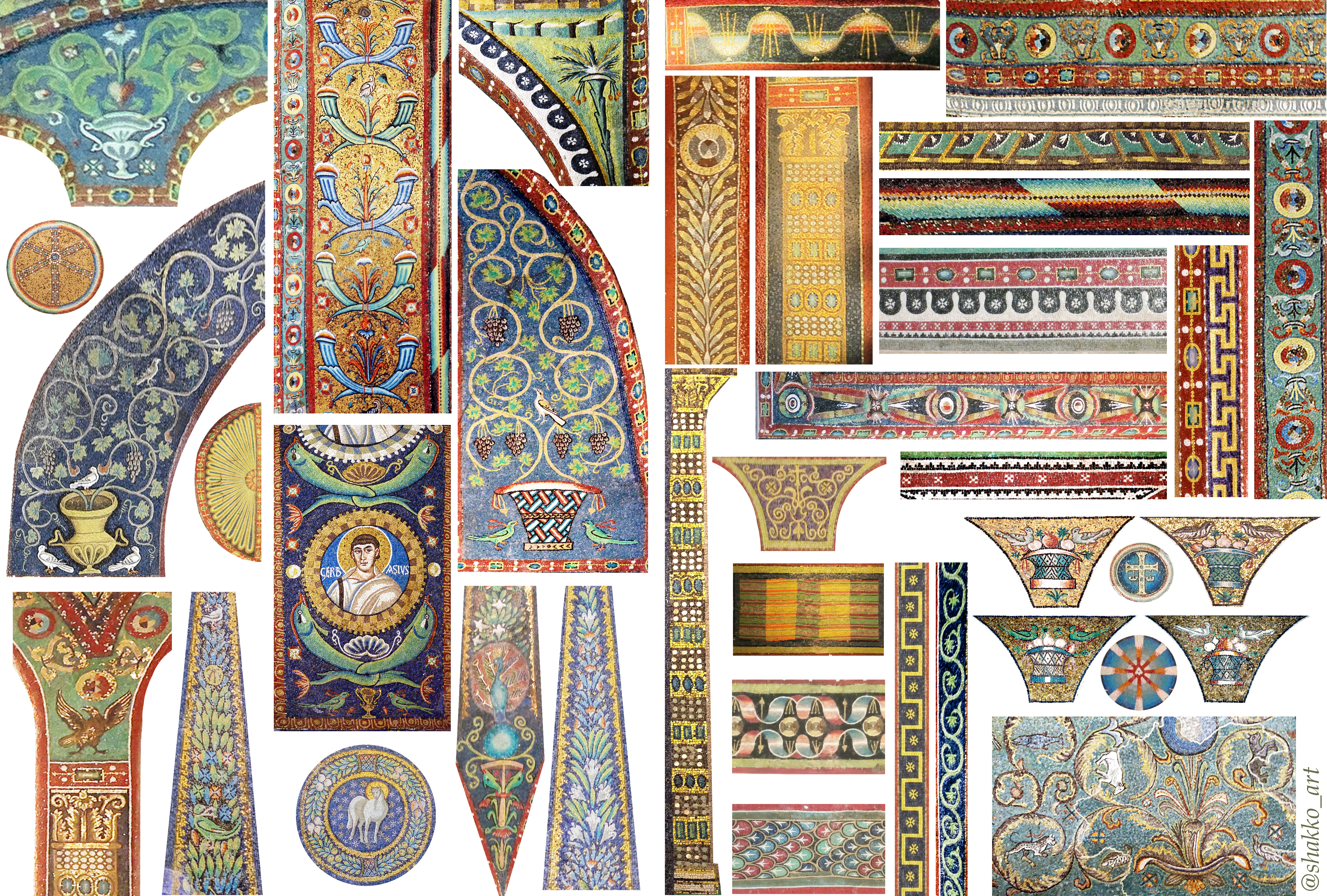
Ornaments

== See also ==
- A La Ronde, an 18th-century house in Devon, England, that is supposedly based on the Basilica
- List of Roman domes
- Ancient Roman and Byzantine domes
- Church architecture
