= Vitalis of Milan =

Christian martyr and saint (c. 1st or 2nd century)

Saint Vitalis of Milan
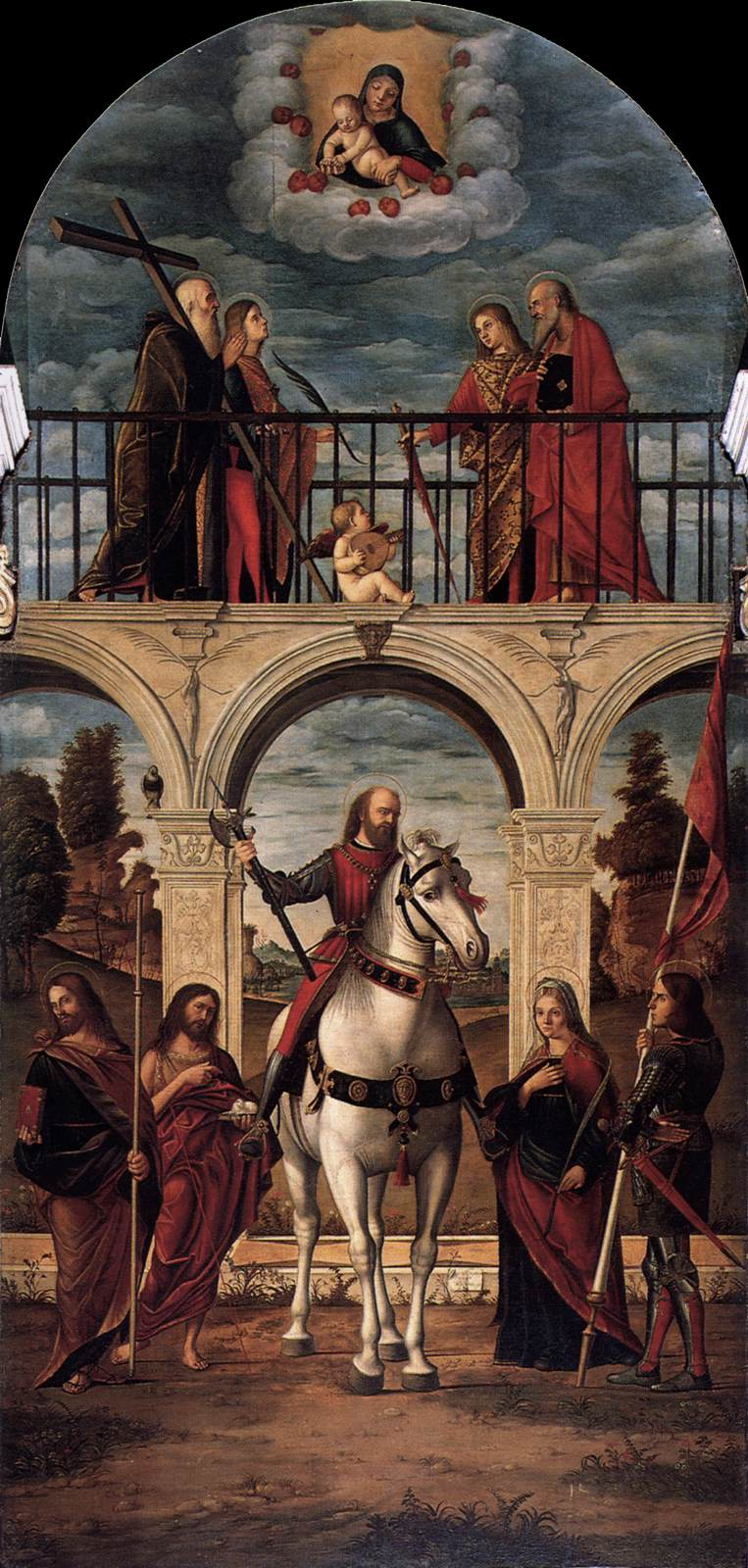
- Glory of St Vitalis, San Vidal, Venice

Martyr
- Died: ~1st century or 2nd century
- Venerated in: Catholic Church
- Feast: 28 April
- Attributes: with Saint Gervase and Saint Protase
- Patronage: Ravenna and Granarolo dell'Emilia, Italy; Thibodaux, Louisiana

Vitalis of Milan (Italian: San Vitale) was an early Christian martyr and saint.

== Biography ==
His legend relates that Vitalis was a wealthy citizen of Milan, perhaps a soldier. He was married to Valeria of Milan. They are supposed to have been the parents of the (perhaps legendary) Gervasius and Protasius.

According to legend, Vitalis was an officer who accompanied the judge Paulinus from Milan to Ravenna. He encouraged Ursicinus of Ravenna to be steadfast at his execution, and himself gave Ursicinus an honorable burial. Vitalis was discovered to be a Christian. Paulinus ordered Vitalis to be racked and then thrown into a deep pit and covered with stones and earth.

The date of his martyrdom is uncertain: some sources say that he was a victim of Nero; others, of Marcus Aurelius. He was martyred in Ravenna, but all else in the story is suspect. "Many scholars believe that the narrative is partly fanciful, recognising in the characters mentioned, other martyrs of the same name venerated both in Milan and Ravenna."

== Veneration ==
Vitalis is honoured as the principal patron saint of the city of Ravenna.

The feast day of Saint Vitalis is 28 April. Churches are dedicated in honor of Saint Vitalis at Assisi, and Rome, in Italy and at Jadera (now Zadar) in Dalmatia (now Croatia), but by far the most famous church bearing his name is the octagonal Basilica of San Vitale at Ravenna, a masterpiece of Byzantine art, erected on the purported site of his martyrdom. He is also the patron saint of Granarolo and Marittima in Italy.

The Cebu Metropolitan Cathedral has Saint Vitalis (Spanish and Cebuano: San Vidal) as its secondary titular after the Immaculate Conception, the nation’s Principal Patroness. A Mass for the 75th anniversary of Cebu's elevation to an archdiocese was held on the feast of Saint Vitalis in 2009, with-then Archbishop of Cebu Cardinal Ricardo Vidal presiding. Though Saint Vitalis and his patronage are largely forgotten, then-auxiliary bishop Ruben Labajo revived interest in devotion to him and the local Cofradía de San Vitalis.

A statue of Saint Vitalis is among those atop the northern half of Gian Lorenzo Bernini’s colonnade surrounding St. Peter’s Square, Vatican City.

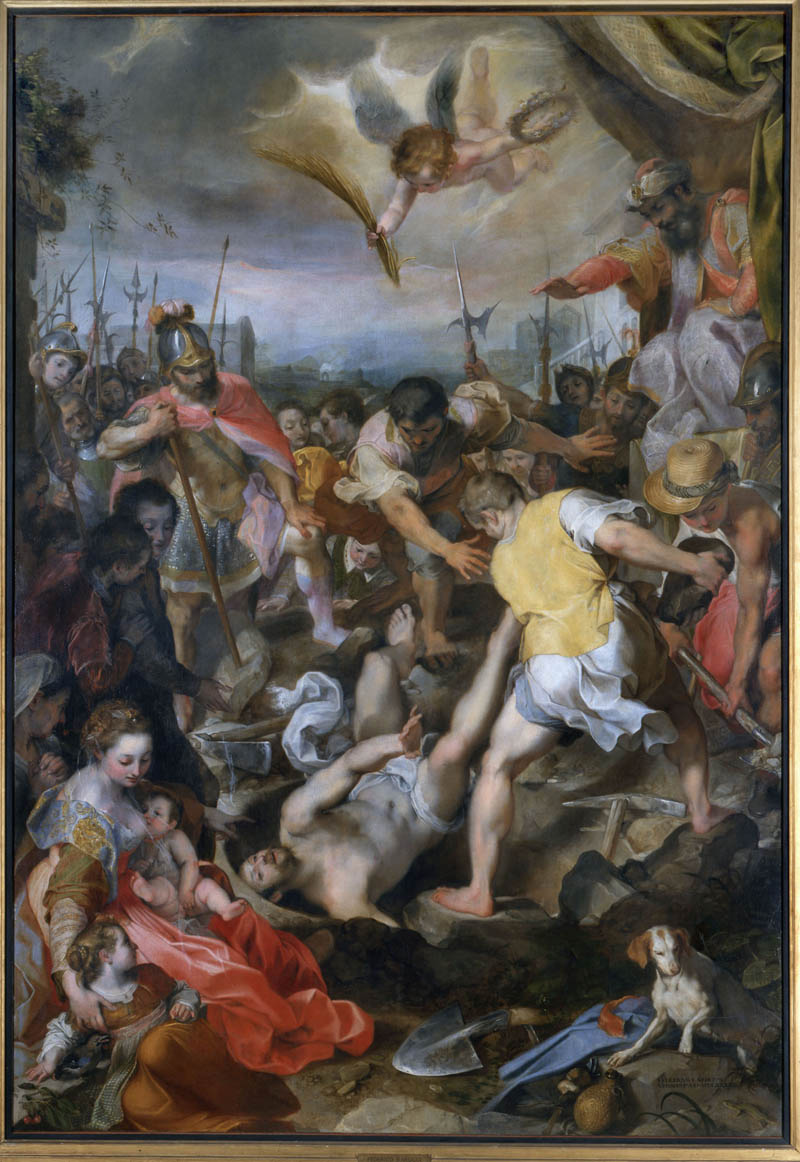
The Martyrdom of Saint Vitalis, by Federico Barocci.

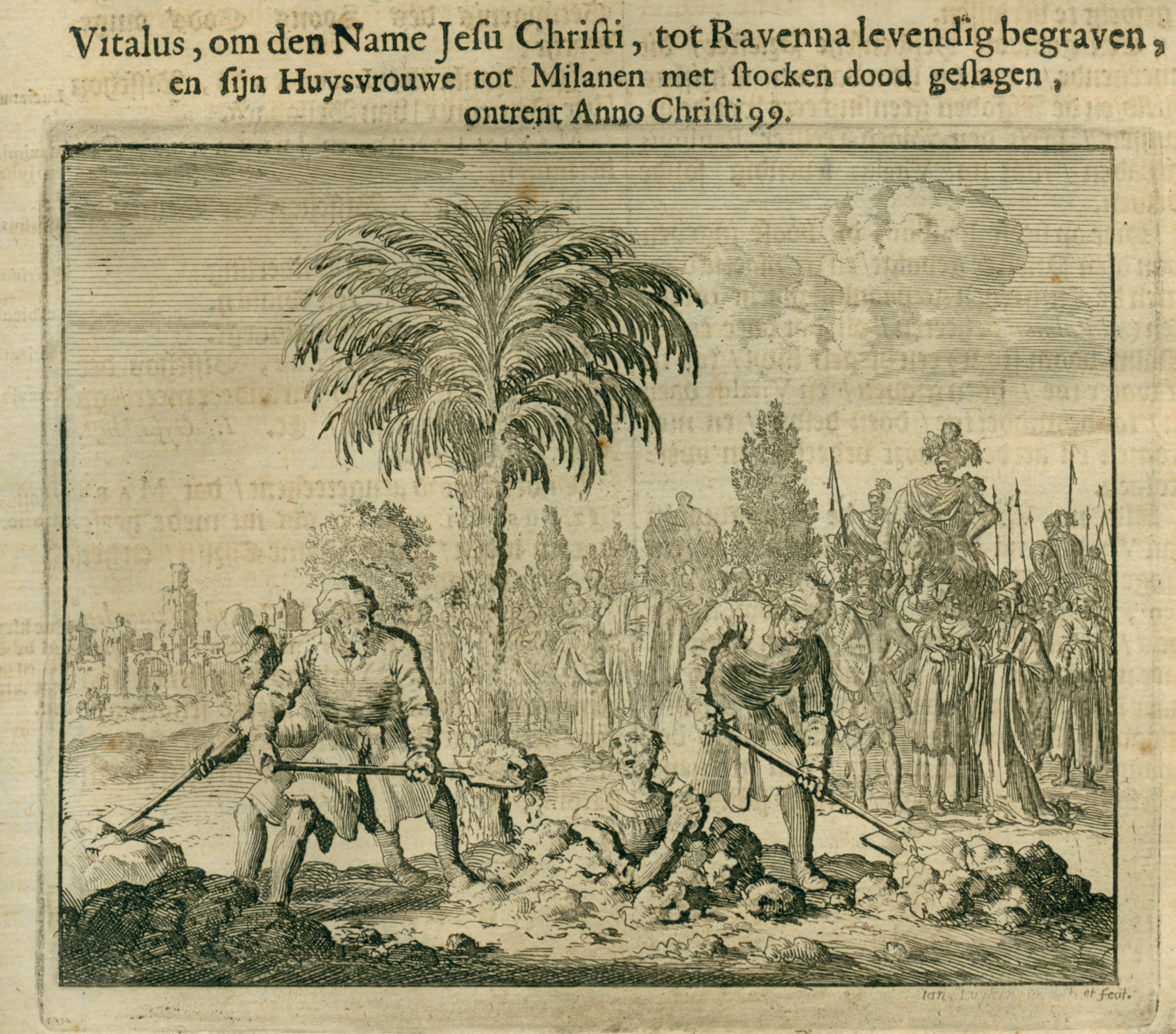
Vitalis being buried alive. From the Martyrs Mirror.

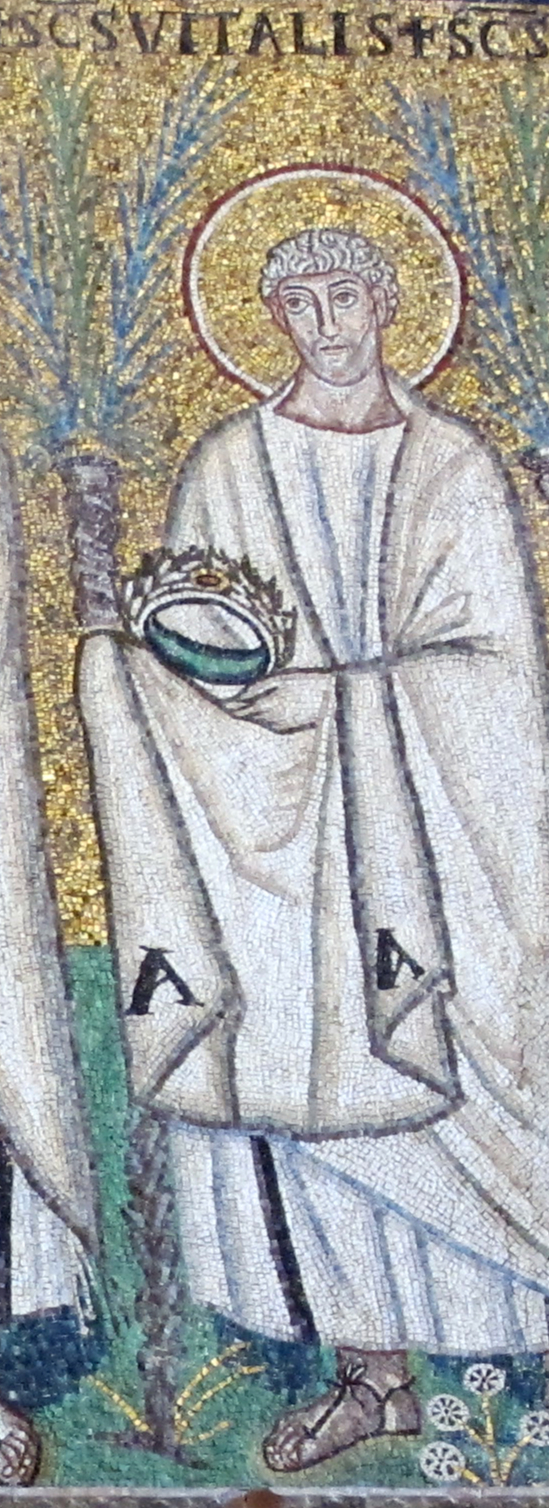
Vitalis among the saints, in Heaven, from the 6th century Basilica of Sant'Apollinare Nuovo, in Ravenna.

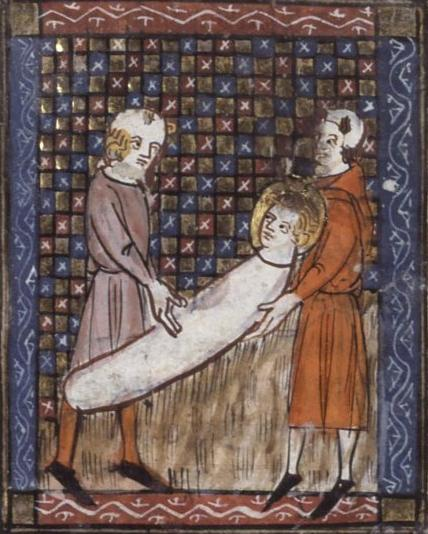
The martyrdom of Saint Vitalis from a 14th-century French manuscript

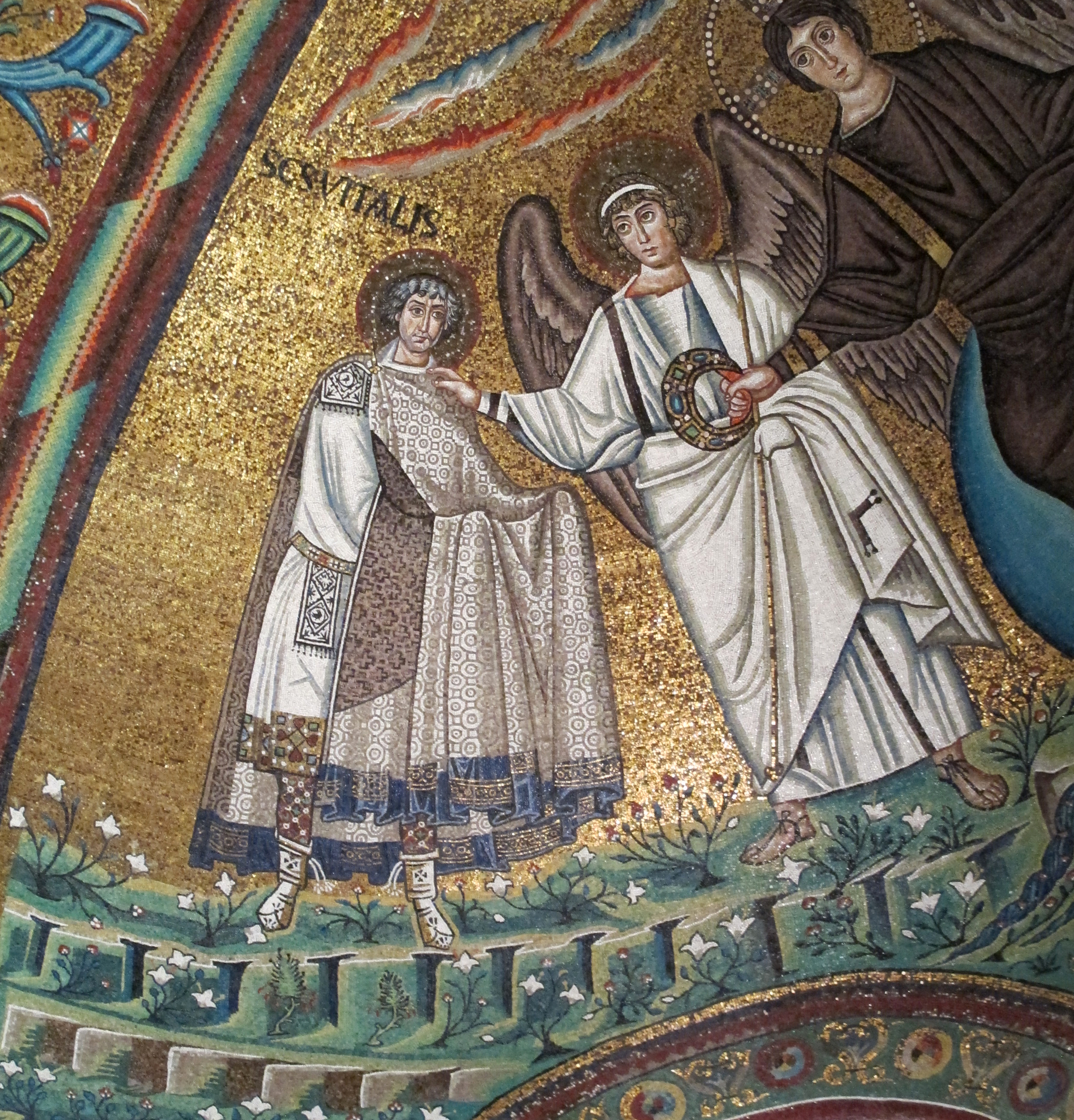
Mosaic of Saint Vitalis in the Apse of the Basilica of San Vitale in Ravenna, Italy

== Sources ==
- Patron Saints: Vitalis of Milan
