= Marina di Marittima =

- Frazione
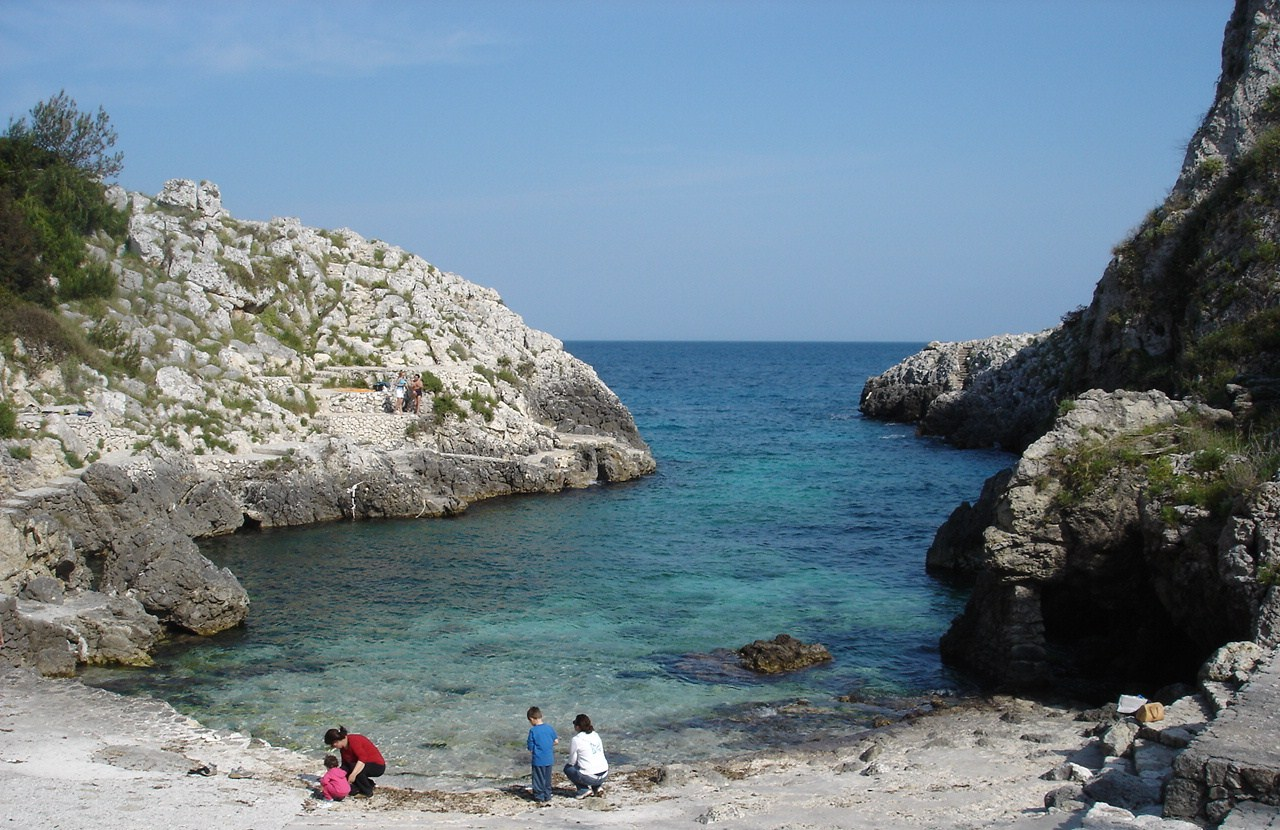
- Acquaviva creek at Marina di Marittima

- Location of Marina di Marittima in Italy
- Coordinates: 40°0′0″N 18°20′57″E
- Country: Italy
- Region: Apulia
- Province: Lecce
- Comune: Diso
- Elevation: 0 m (0 ft)
- Time zone: UTC+1 (CET)
  - Summer (DST): UTC+2 (CEST)
- Postal code: 73030
- Dialing code: 0836
- Patron saint: Assumption of Mary
- Saint day: 15 August

Marina di Marittima is a seaside resort on the Adriatic coast of Salento in the comune of Diso in the province of Lecce in the Apulia region of southeast Italy. It takes its name from the frazione that is located in the hinterland: Marittima.
