= Marittima =

- Frazione
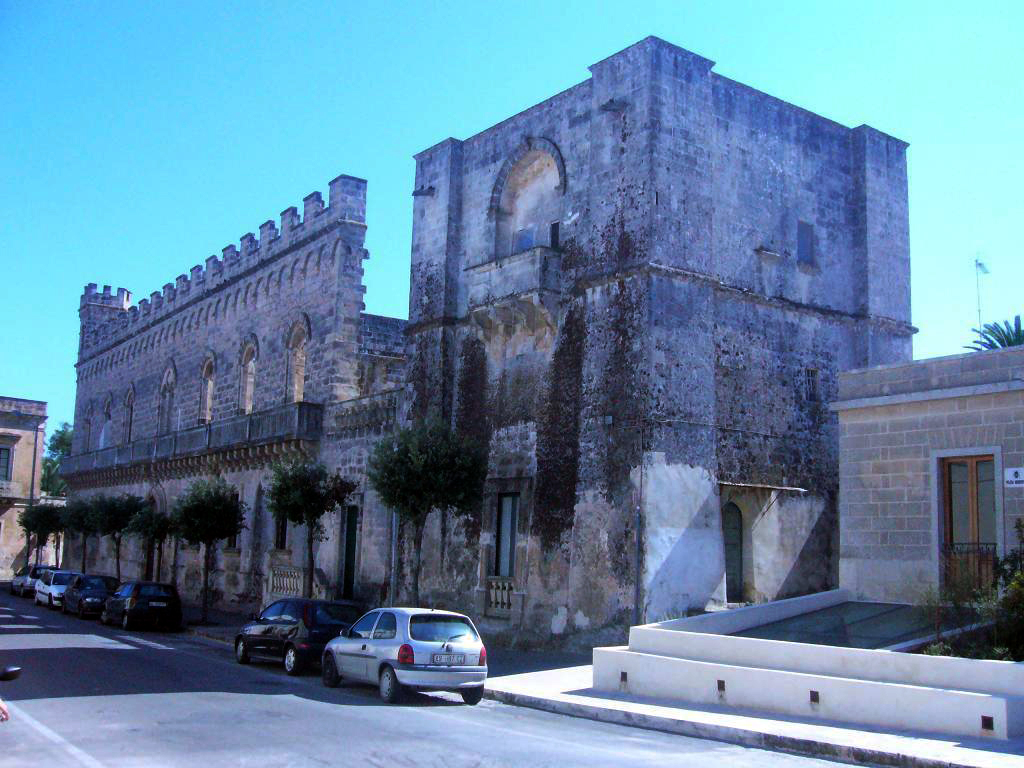
- Marittima

- Location of Marittima in Italy
- Coordinates: 39°59′0″N 18°20′54″E
- Country: Italy
- Region: Apulia
- Province: Lecce
- Comune: Diso
- Elevation: 90 m (300 ft)

Population (about)
  - Total: 2,150
- Time zone: UTC+1 (CET)
  - Summer (DST): UTC+2 (CEST)
- Postal code: 73030
- Patron saint: Vitalis of Milan
- Saint day: 28 April

Marittima is a hamlet of the Diso municipality in the province of Lecce.

Located in the lowest part of Salento between Castro, Andrano and Diso, Marittima is about 48 km from Lecce. The part of the country overlooking the coast is named Marina di Marittima

== Toponymy ==
According to popular opinion, the name of the town is due to its proximity to the sea. In fact, the coast is only a kilometre from the town. It has also been claimed that the name is related to the founders of the area, who arrived by sea and would have been called marittimi; so Marittima indicates the place where they lived.

== History ==
There is no definite information on the origins of the town although it is assumed that Marittima was founded or inhabited by the Messapi and that it suffered the same fate as its neighbours, Vaste, Diso and Castro, which were overtaken first by the Romans and then by the Byzantines, the Normans and Angevins.

The first written document confirming the presence of the settlement dates back to 1277; the Angevin registers from one year inform us of a certain "Rubeo de Soliaco" who was named "Lord of Casale Marittima". In the feudal period, Marittima was part of Castro County which was under the control of various noble families including the Orsini Del Balzo, Gattinara, Ruiz De Castro and the Lopez De Zunica families. This control lasted until 1809 when the Rossi family became the owners of Marittima.

In the feudal Middle Ages, the daily life of the area's farmers and fishermen was shaken up when, on the 28 July 1537, the Turks (who were allies of the French against the Spanish governor of the Kingdom of Naples) seized Castro and destroyed several towns, including Marittima.

Some years later, in 1573 when Marittima had only a hundred inhabitants, the town was ransacked again, this time by Saracen pirates (as were many neighbouring areas). Attacks by pirates occurred frequently until the early 19th century. In order to defend Salento, a system of watchtowers was built around Marittima. Between the end of 400 AD and the start of 500 AD a large tower – known as Torre Lupo (Wolf Tower) – was erected and still stands. Several turrets were also built in the inhabited centre.

Marittima was an independent municipality until 1809.

== Monuments and places of interest ==
=== Mother-Church ===
The Mother-Church is dedicated to the Protector Saint Vitale. It was rebuilt several times: once in the 16th Century after the devastation by the Turkish and then in the 18th century due to the structure's dilapidation. The current structure dates back to early 1900.

It has a simple facade with a central doorway which is flanked by two niches. The interior is of a neoclassical style with three arched aisles containing numerous paintings. The most important of which, Saint Vitale on Horseback, is on the high altar. In the central vault there is a stunning elliptical dome on which is painted the glory of the Trinity and the family of Saint Vitale.

=== Shrine of Our Lady of Constantinople ===
The Shrine of Our Lady of Constantinople, built in 1610, has preserved its architectural lines despite adjustments made over the centuries. This shrine is linked to an ancient tradition. An image of Our Lady of Constantinople on Lecce stone now dominates the high altar on an artistic canopy.

The walls of the single nave, once adorned with numerous paintings, are now home to only those of Saint Francis of Assisi and Immacolata. Of notable interest are the baroque portal, the high altar containing the oval icon of the Virgin and the altar of the Crucifix dated 1691. There is also a small lead pipe organ which dates back to the 18th century.

=== Convent of Conventual Fathers ===
The Convent of Conventual Fathers was constructed between 1615 and 1619. This is known because, in 1614, it was not yet listed among the monasteries which existed at the time in Apulia. However, in 1621, a certain Catrini was buried there.

The task of the convent's religious community was to guard the Shrine of Our Lady of Constantinople and to run a small hospital. The convent was suppressed for the first time in 1652 as a result of the Bolla Instaurandae of Pope Innocent X and was reactivated in 1654. The year 1795 marked the definitive end of the convent. Over the years it was owned by different families; the premises were even used as a tobacco processing factory.

=== City Towers ===
The City Towers were built by the Marittima University or by private citizen to defend the small town against attacks by Turkish pirates above all after the destruction of Otranto (1480) and Castro (1537 and 1573).

Originally there were five but today only four towers remain: Torre di Alfonso (Alfonso Tower), Torre Baltassara (Baltassara Tower), Torre della Piazza (Piazza Tower) – the only one which is still inhabited – and Torre di Paolino Russi (Paolino Russi Tower.)

=== Torre di Alfonso (Alfonso Towers) ===
The largest and the most artistically beautiful, Torre di Alfonso (named after the owner) is located in the heart of the old town, in Via Cellini. It has a square base and was refined by adding a ledge and a balcony which adorn the upper face.

=== Colonna Osanna (Hosanna Column) ===
The Hosanna Column, so-called because it was used during the Palm Sunday, was erected in 1620 and was originally situated in the middle of the main square. It was dismantled in 1926 and rebuilt in 1961 near the Shrine of Our Lady of Constantinople. It is made from local stone and is topped by a cross.

=== Other monuments ===
- Palazzo Baronale Miglietta (The Baronial Palace of Miglietta) (1745)
- Palazzi e ville signorili (houses and lordly palaces) (700 AD – 800 AD – 900 AD)
- Torri Colombaie (Dovecot Tower) (1600)
- Frantoio Ipogeo (Underground oil mill)

Galleria Santuario Madonna di Costantinopoli

Interno

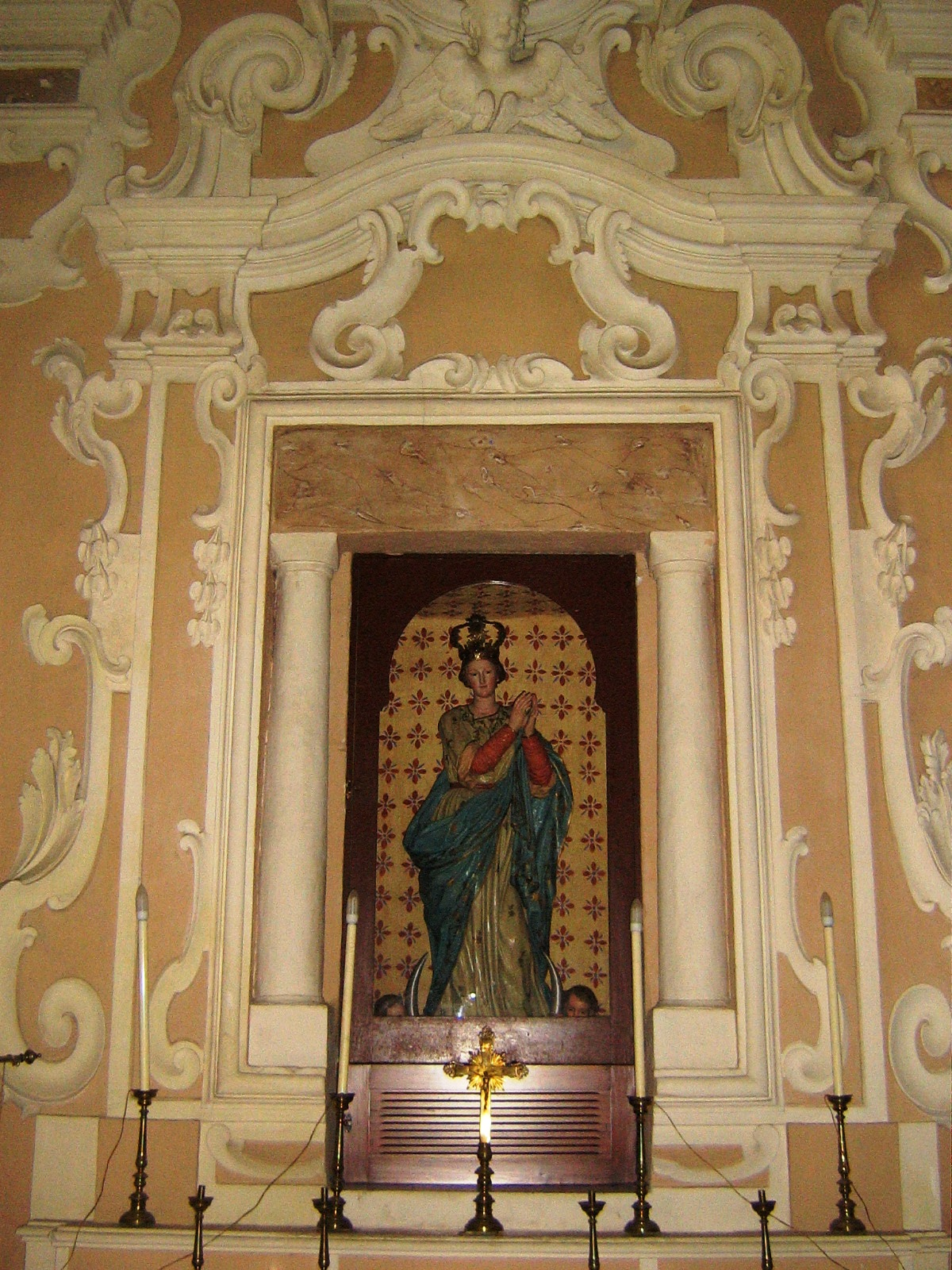
Altare dell'Immacolata

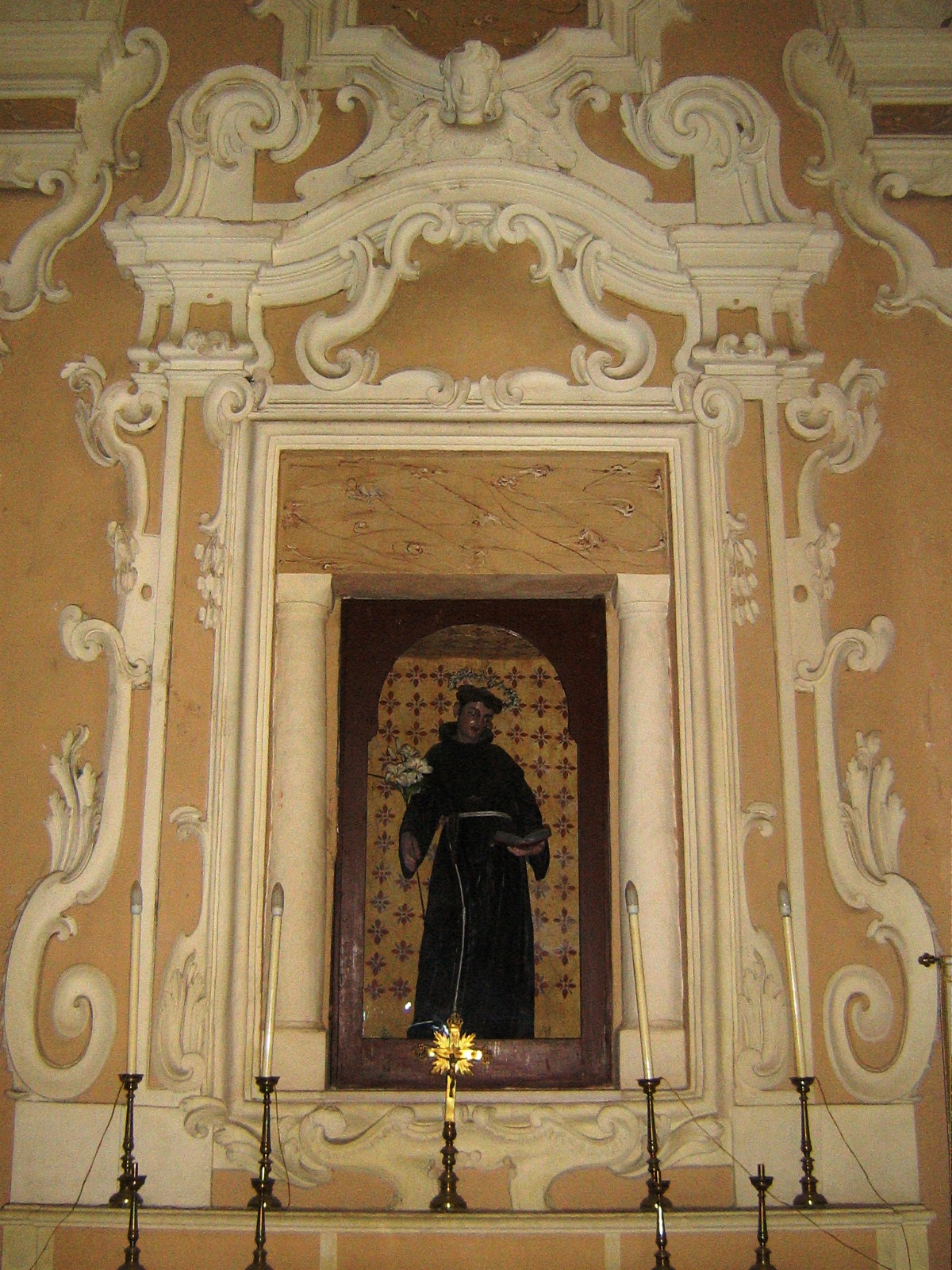
Altare di Sant'Antonio da Padova

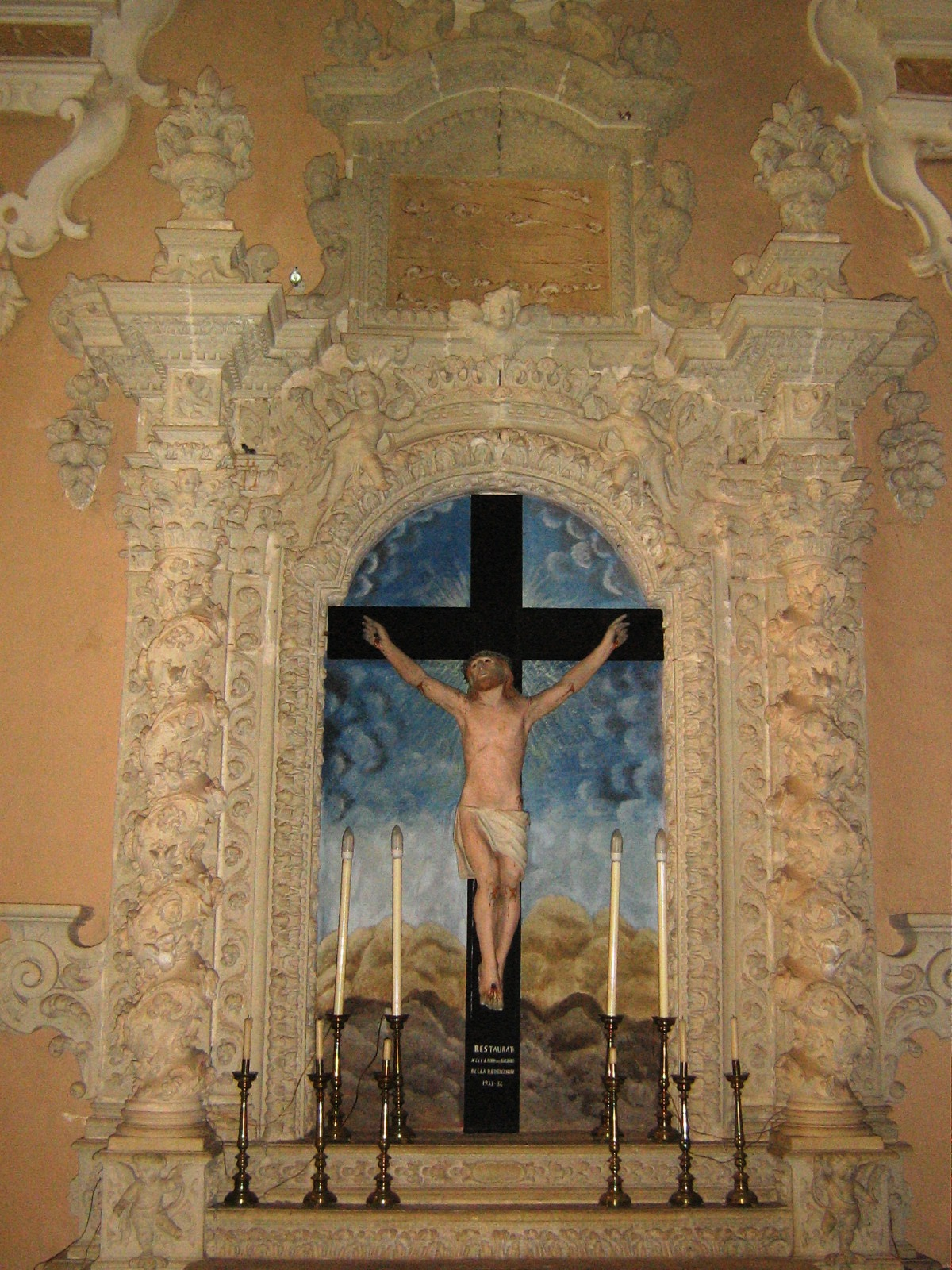
Altare del Crocifisso

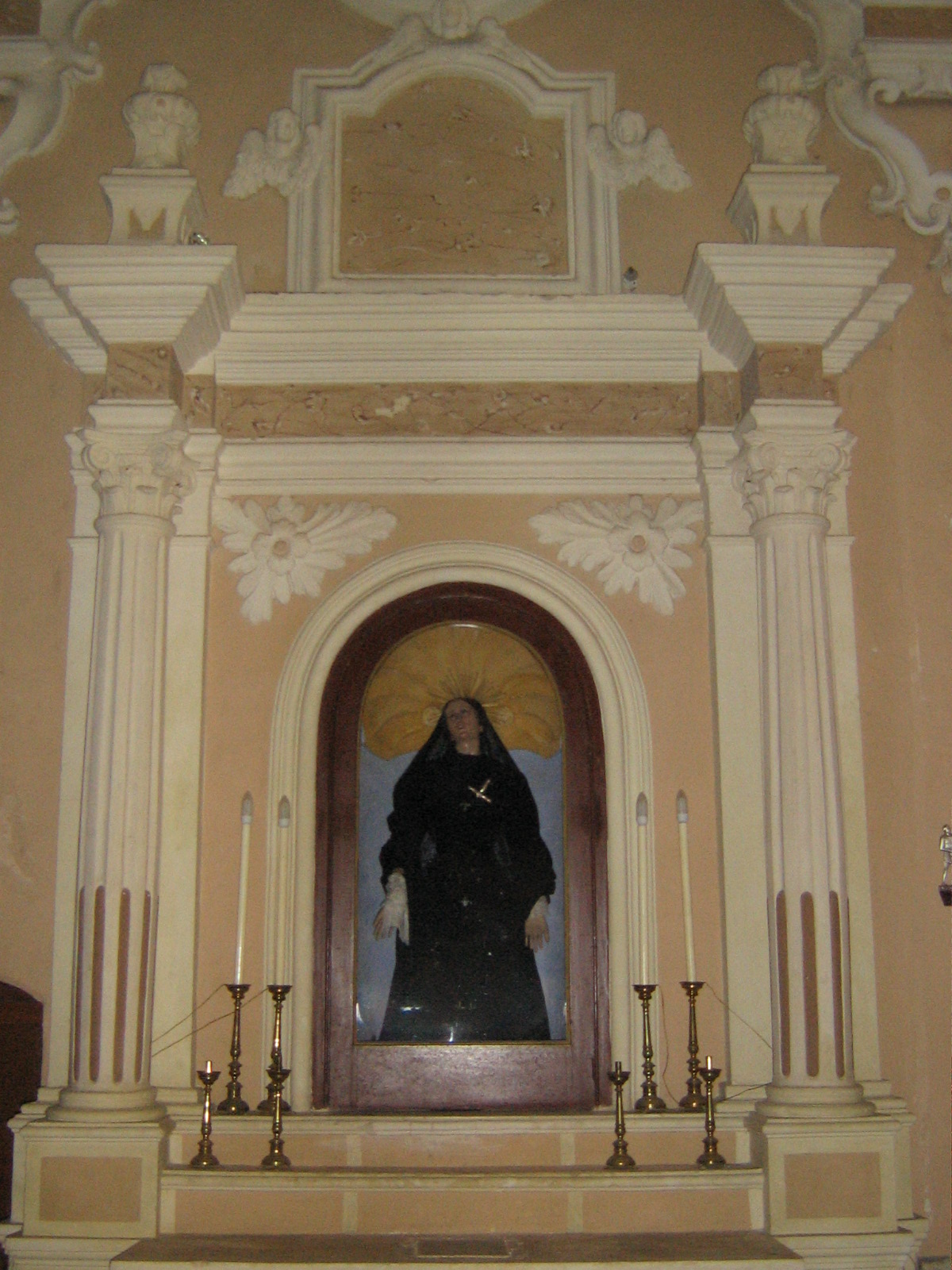
Altare dell'Addolorata

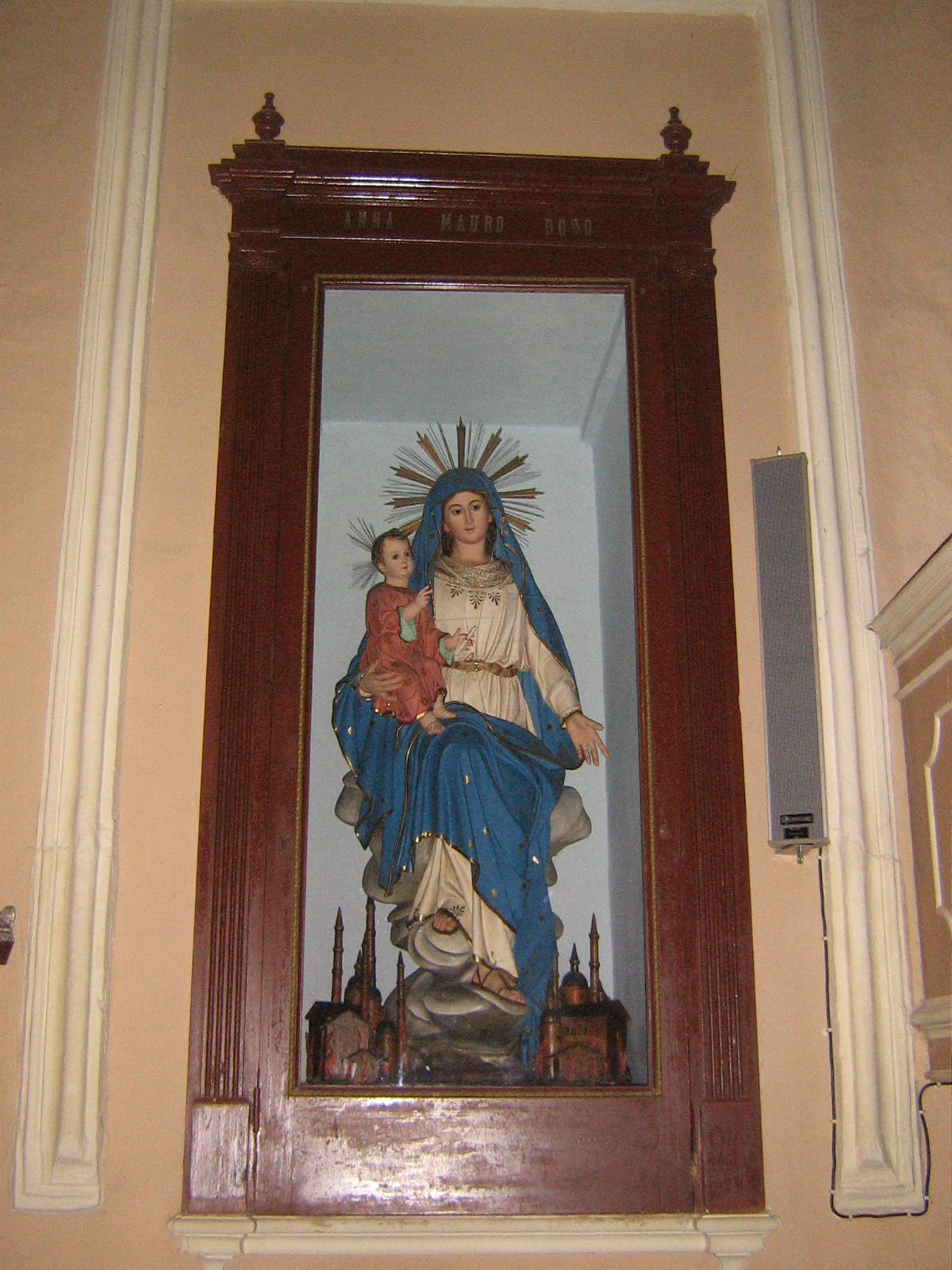
Statua Madonna di Costantinopoli

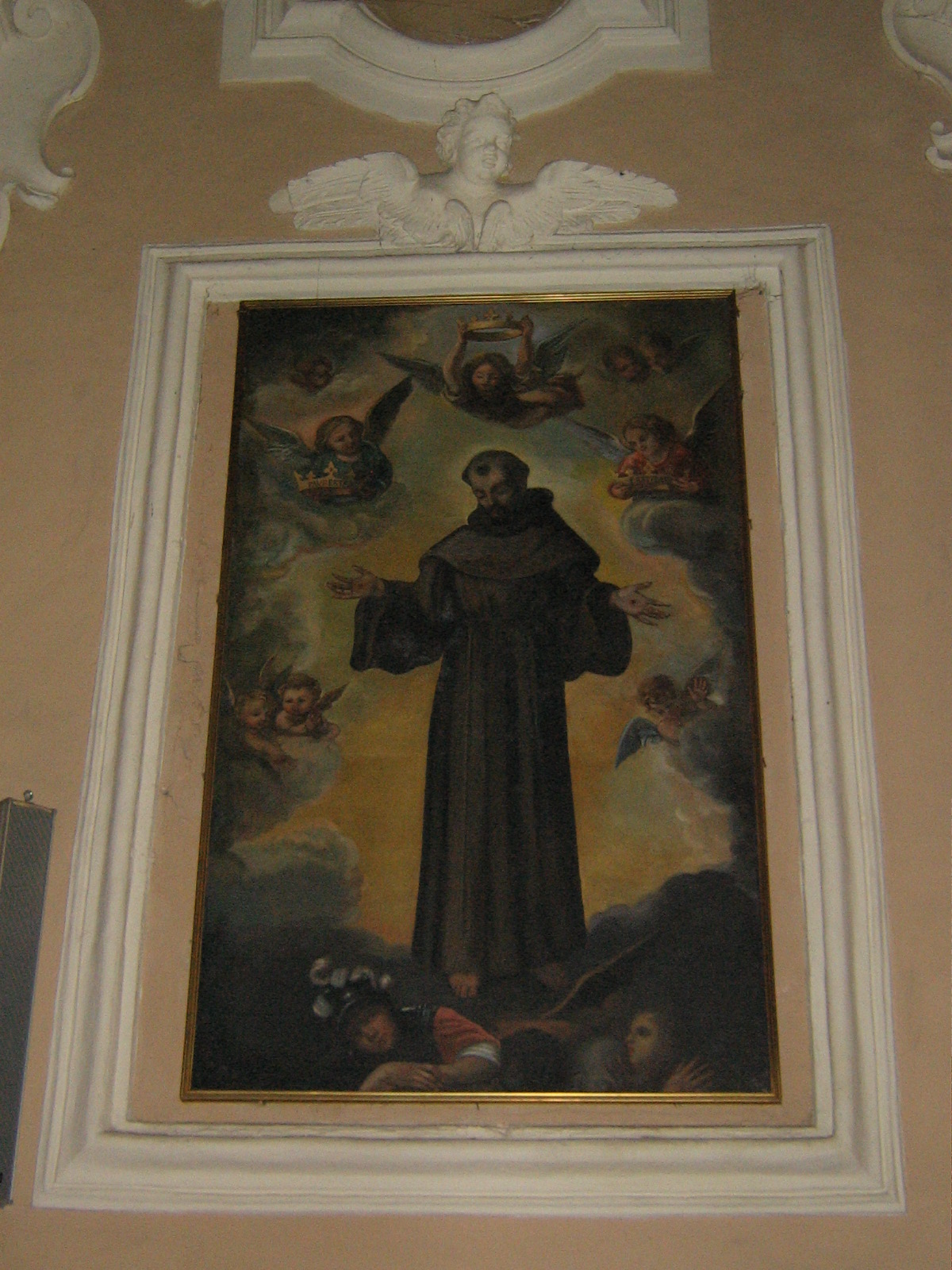
Tela di San Francesco d'Assisi

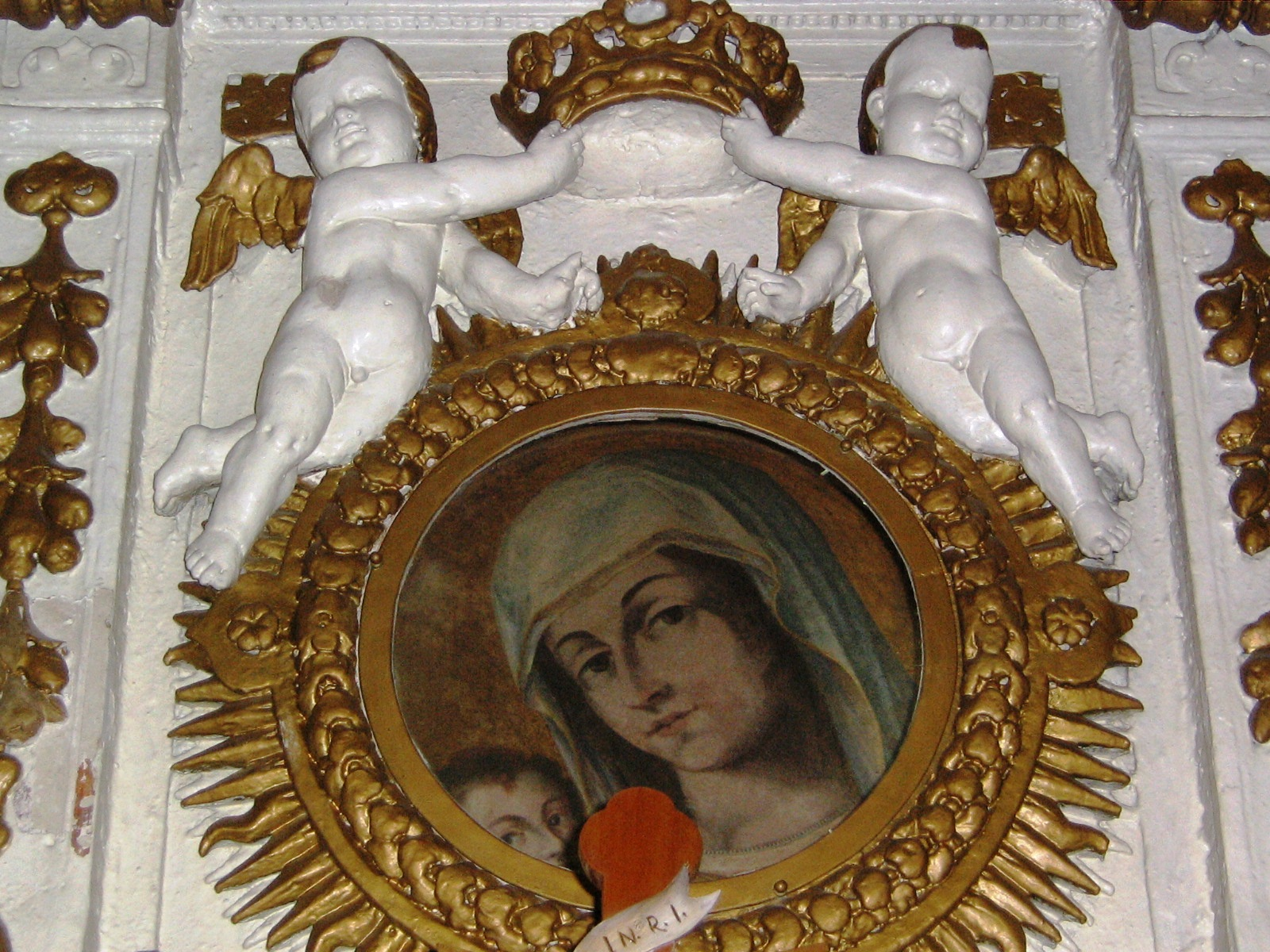
Affresco Madonna di Costantinopoli

== Economy ==
The economy is predominantly agricultural and is based on the production of oil, vegetables and tobacco. Some food companies reside here. With the growth of tourism in Salento, in recent years there has been a sharp increase in the appearance of hotels, guest houses and other holiday accommodation.

== Events ==
- Fiera Madonna di Costantinopoli – first Sunday of March
- Festa patronale di San Vitale – 28 April
- Festa de la cornula - 11/12 August
- Festa della fica – 16 August

== Transportation ==
=== Roads ===
The main roads are:

- Adriatica highway 16; Lecce-Maglie.
- Provincial road 363; Maglie-Santa Cesarea Terme

You can also reach the centre via the internal provincial road: SP81 Vaste-Diso-Tricase- Gagliano del Capo, SP82 Diso-Spongano, SP83 Diso Vignacastrisi –Castro. SP81 Gagliano del Capo-Tricase-Vaste, SP195 Gagliano del Capo-Litoranea Otranto-Leuca.

=== Railways ===
The nearest train station is Spongano on the Gagliano del Capo-Maglie line from Ferrovie del Sud Est, the nearest train station to Lecce.

=== Airports ===
The closest civil airports are:

- Aeroporto internazionale del Salento based at Brindisi.
- Aeroporto di Taranto-Grottaglie "Marcello Arlotta", which operates scheduled charter flights.
- Aeroporto internazionale di Bari "Karol Wojtyla".

== See also ==
- Diso
- Marina di Marittima (Marittima Marina)
- Torre Lupo (Wolf Tower)

== Notes ==
1. The History of Marittima
