= Ioannina (daughter of Belisarius) =

Byzantine noblewoman, daughter of Belisarius

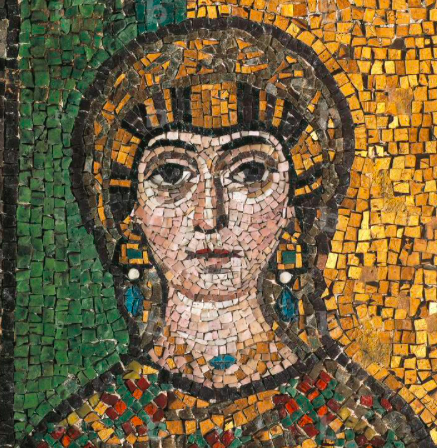
Depiction from a contemporary portrait mosaic in the Basilica of San Vitale, Ravenna, c. 547

Ioannina, also spelled Joannina, (Greek: Ιωάννινα, born c. 530) was a Byzantine noblewoman and the daughter of general Belisarius and his wife Antonina. Ioannina also briefly married from 547 to 548 to Anastasius, the son of Anastasius Sabinianus, who served as consul in 517, and the grandson of empress Theodora. Ioannina is also believed to possibly be the namesake of the Greek city of Ioannina.

== Early life ==
Ioannina was born around 530, mostly likely in modern-day Turkey. Ioannina was the daughter of Byzantine general Belisarius, the leading commander of Byzantine Emperor Justinian I's forces, and Antonina, a noblewoman and close attendant to Empress Theodora. Ioannina is Belisarius and Antonina's only confirmed child, however she did have at least two half-siblings, Photius and an unnamed sister who married Ildiger, both children of Antonina from a previous marriage. Ioannina also had an adopted brother, Theodosius, the godson of Belisarius.

== Marriage to Anastasius ==
Ioannina, being Belisarius' only child, was the heiress of his large fortune, acquired from his campaigns throughout Italy and North Africa. Empress Theodora, seeking to capitalize on this wealth, arranged the marriage of her grandson, Anastasius, to Ioannina at first in 544. Anastasius was the son of Anastasius Sabinianus, the consul in 517, and an unnamed daughter of Theodora from before her marriage to Justinian.

Antonina objected to the union and the political alliance it entailed with Theodora, and both she and Belisarius attempted to delay the marriage while in Italy. Theodora, however, determined to continue the planned marriage, knew that Ioannina was Belisarius' only child and his sole heiress. With Antonina and Belisarius away in Italy, Theodora pressured Ioannina and forced her into an unsanctioned relationship with Anastasius. Ioannina was disgraced by Anastasius who sexually coerced her and raped her. Theodora then arranged the marriage of the two, with Antonina and Belisarius still absent. Despite the forced beginning, Ioannina and Anastasius developed a loving relationship. This account is provided to us by Procopius who historians have considered an untrustworthy source. David Allen Parnell instead suggests that the more scandalous elements of the story are fictitious and was created to make Theodora and Antonina look bad, whilst emasculating Belisarius.

The marriage lasted eight months, until Theodora's death in June, 548, and Belisarius and Antonina's return to Constantinople around the same time. Antonina convinced Belisarius to join her in annulling the marriage, for which she received widespread criticism from the Byzantine nobility, who believed Antonina was ungrateful for the support which Theodora had given her. Due to her disgraceful raping at the hands of Anastasius, Ioannina's reputation was deeply tainted, which greatly harmed her chances of ever remarrying. There is little to no evidence regarding Ioannina's later life, following the annulment, and it is unknown whether Ioannina ever remarried or had children. It is possible that Ioannina may have been the mother of a granddaughter of Antonina who was courted by Sergius, a Byzantine general who had served as the governor of Tripolitania.

== City of Ioannina ==
The city of Ioannina, situated in Epirus in northwestern Greece, is believed to have been founded by Emperor Justinian I sometime in the sixth century. According to the city's foundation histories, it was named after Ioannina herself, possibly as a symbol of the political alliance between Justinian and Belisarius. The city, as well as the nearby Ioannina Castle, both may have been named for Ioannina.
