= Valeria of Milan =

Ancient Christian saint

Saint Valeria of Milan
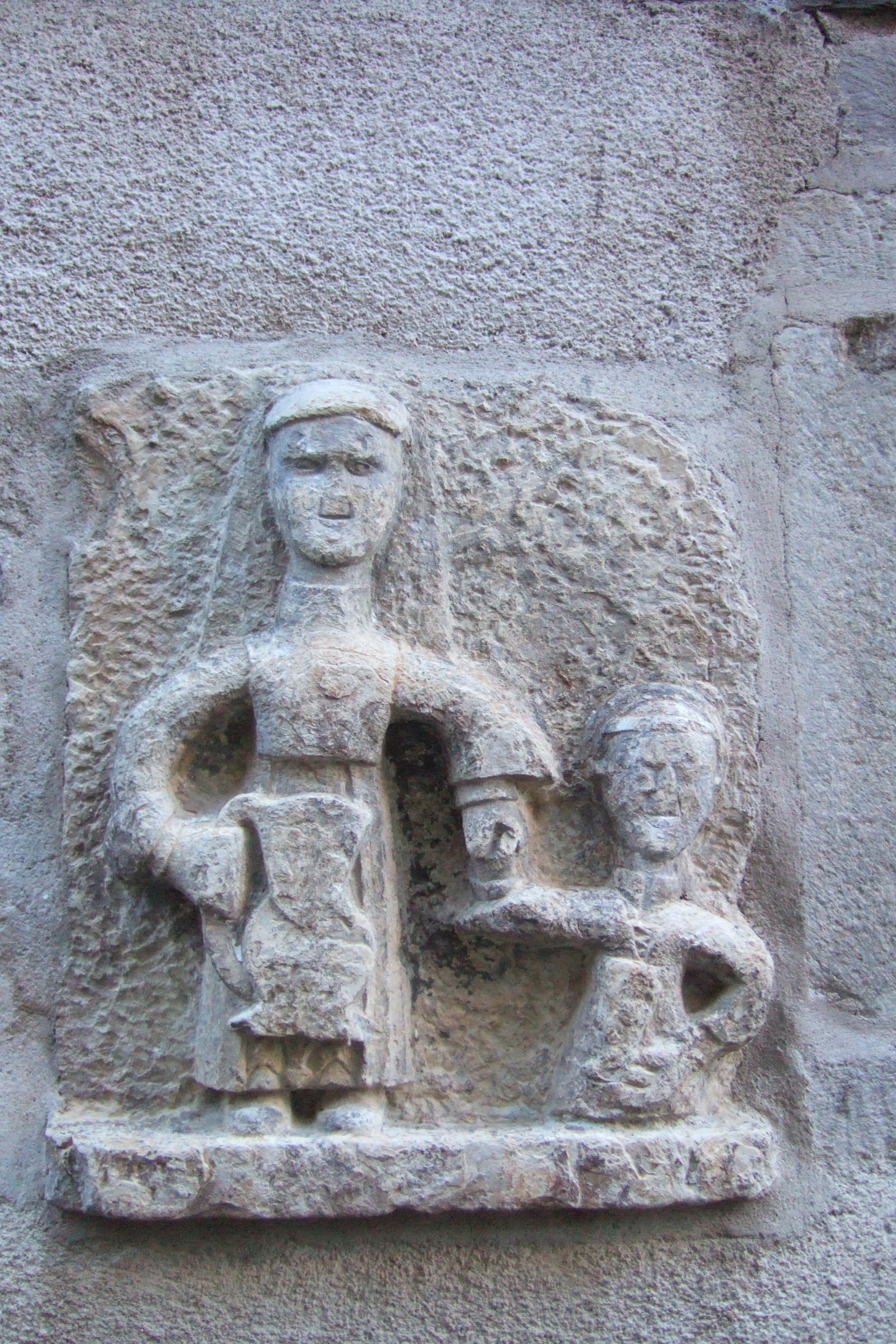
- Statue of Saint Valeria, Rue Saint-Vital, Sauveterre-de-Rouergue, France. The statue depicts Valeria and one of her sons carrying water to her husband Vitalis of Milan (Vital).

Martyr
- Died: ~1st century or 2nd century Rome
- Major shrine: Relic and reliquary in Thibodaux, Louisiana
- Feast: 28 April
- Attributes: With Saint Vitalis, Saint Gervasius and Saint Protasius; being beaten with clubs
- Patronage: Thibodaux, Louisiana; invoked for protection from storms and floods; Seregno, Italy

Valeria of Milan (d. 1st or 2nd century), or Valérie, according to Christian tradition, was the wife of Vitalis of Milan and the mother of Gervasius and Protasius.

== History ==
"Some modern writers contend that she may have been a character in a work of fiction mistaken for history."

It is said she was from a noble family, and at an early age was baptized, being among the first converts to Christianity in the city of Milan. The reigning Pope had commanded the priests of the area to organize nine decurias, each consisting of five men and five virgins. Their duty was to gather the corpses of Christians who had been martyred in the Coliseum (Flavian Amphitheatre) and other places of martyrdom the preceding day. She was martyred for burying Christian martyrs, and then refusing to sacrifice to the Roman gods

According to one tradition, shortly after the martyrdom of her husband, Vitalis of Milan, in Ravenna, she refused to join in a celebration and sacrifice to pagan gods, and was severely beaten, causing her death two days later in Milan.

According to another tradition, on 3 June, Valeria was discovered by Roman soldiers searching for Christians. She avowed herself to be one of the faithful. Following terrible tortures, Valeria was beheaded in the Coliseum in the company of several other martyrs. Her remains were gathered by other Christians and were deposited in the Catacombs of Saint Sebastian.

== Veneration ==
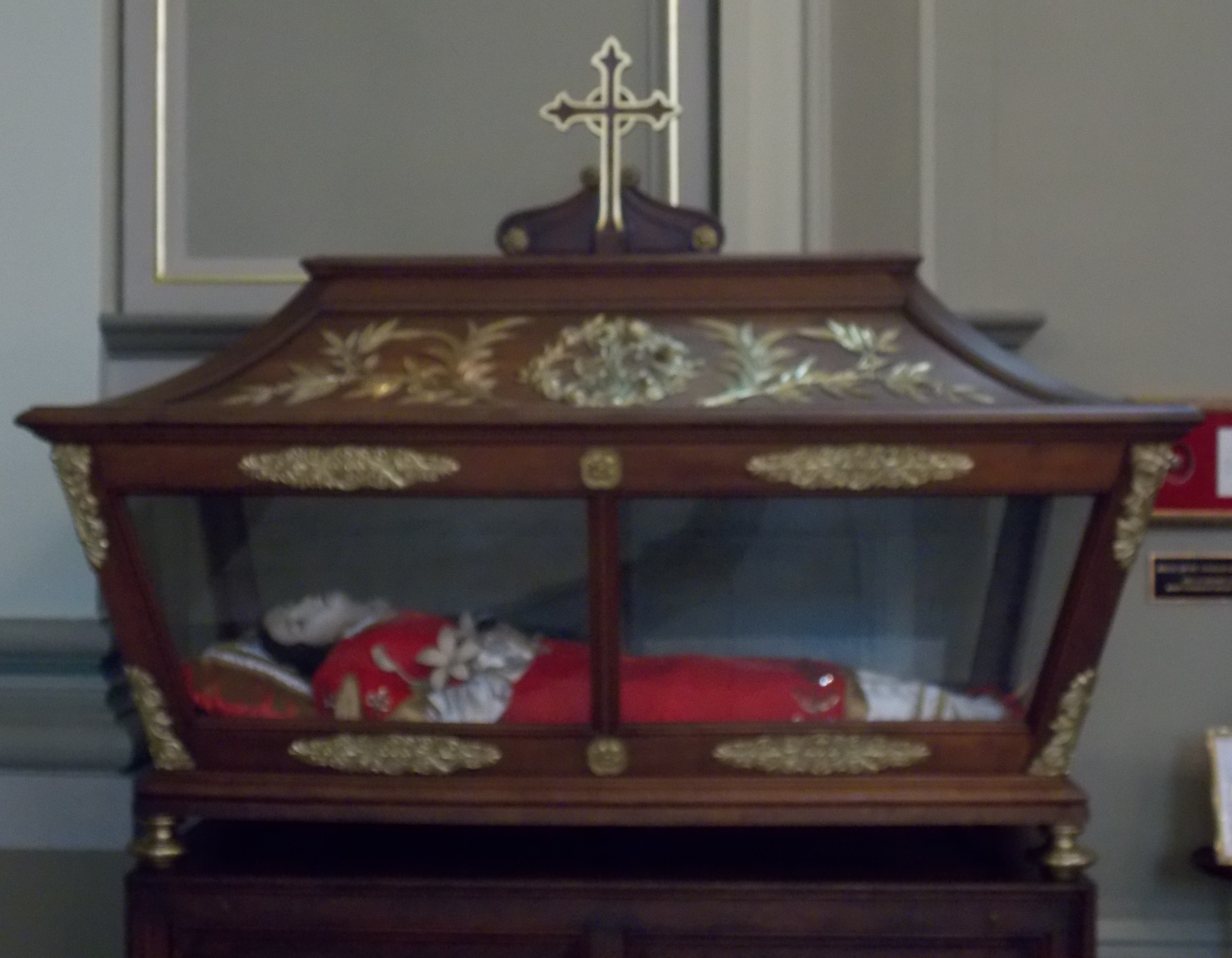
St. Valeria's relics in St. Joseph Co-Cathedral, Thibodaux, Louisiana

A mosaic depicting Valeria appears in the Basilica of Sant'Apollinare Nuovo in Ravenna. A church dedicated to her in Milan was destroyed in 1786.

Canon Charles M. Ménard (1845–1896), pastor of St. Joseph Church (now Co-Cathedral) in Thibodaux, Louisiana, made a pilgrimage to Rome in 1867, marking the anniversary of the martyrdom of Peter the Apostle. Longing to bring back an important relic for the veneration of his parishioners, he requested an audience with Cardinal Costantino Patrizi Naro. Patrizi owned two such relics: one of Saint Prosper, as well as part of the arm-bone of Saint Valeria. After much persuasion, the cardinal agreed to relinquish the latter.

The prized relic was placed in a box of pasteboard, and sealed with Cardinal Patrizi's coat of arms. The relic was then sealed in a waxen statue which represented a young woman. It was dressed in a robe of silk moire embroidered with gold and a crimson tunic of velvet and gold ornamented with fringes. It was laid in a coffin-like reliquary of oak and glass from The Netherlands, and decorated with gilded copper.

On the morning of 18 April 1868, the steamboat Nina Simmes arrived from New Orleans, by way of Bayou Lafourche, with the reliquary of Saint Valeria. It was placed on the altar of St. Joseph Church, with solemn ceremonies attended by more than four thousand people.

Since then, Valeria has been known as the Patroness of Thibodaux, and is especially invoked for protection from storms and floods.

On 25 May 1916, a fire began in the sacristy of St. Joseph's, and within minutes it was realized the church would not be saved. Cries of "Save Saint Valérie! Save Saint Valérie!" were heard from the onlookers. In fact, the reliquary was one of the few objects saved from the ruins. The reliquary was then brought to the Mount Carmel Convent Chapel until the new church was built, where it was installed with due reverence.

The British Museum has in its collection an enameled reliquary sometimes misidentified as that of Valeria of Milan, but the reliquary is actually associated with Valerie of Limoges, a different saint.

== Bibliography ==
- Cross, Crozier, and Crucible, edited by Glenn R. Conrad, The Roman Catholic Church of the Archdiocese of New Orleans, 1993. ISBN 0-940984-78-4
