= Diso =

Diso Dhyssos (Greek)
- Comune
- Comune di Diso
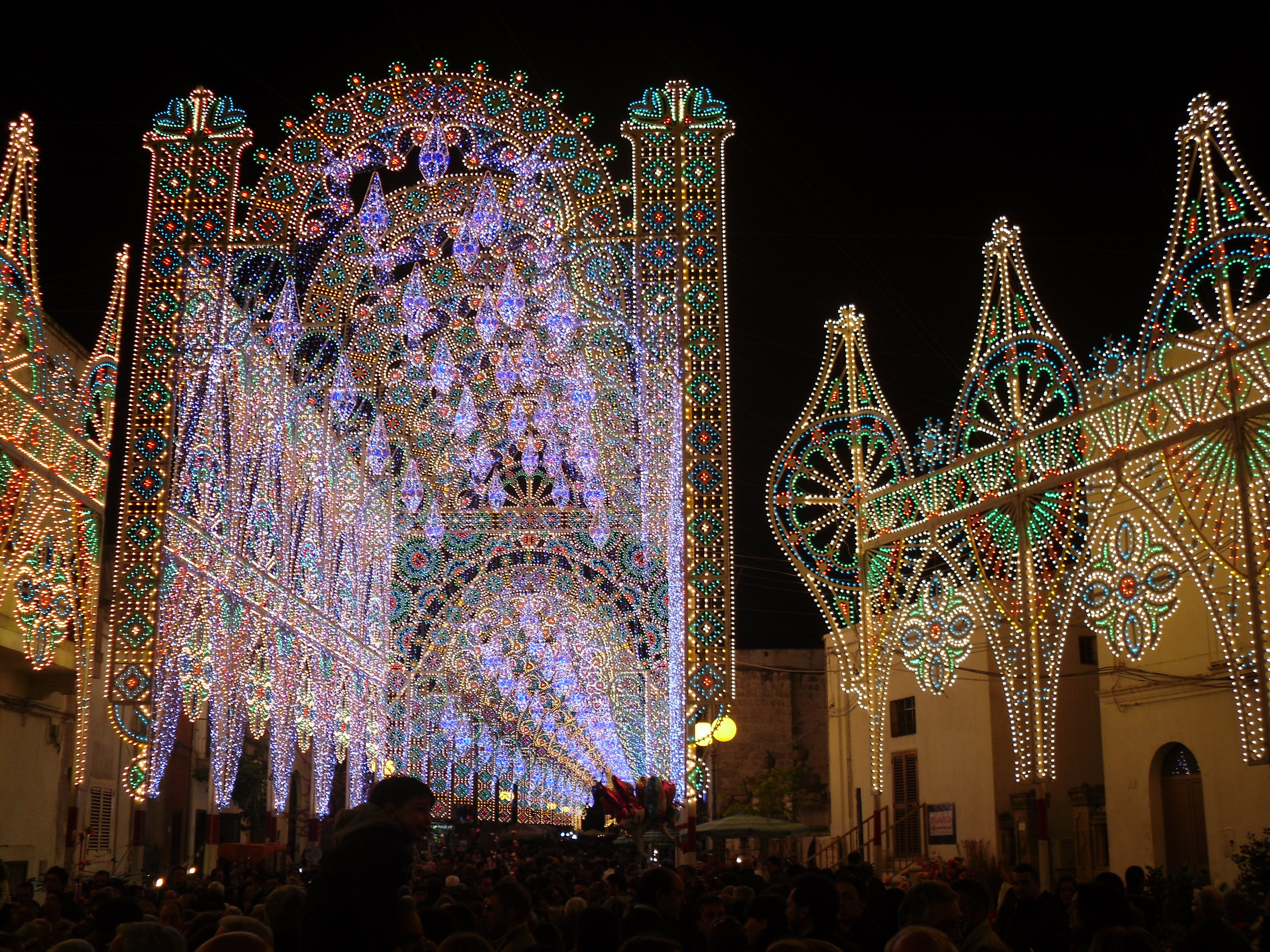
- A sequence of colourful lights in the city centre during the Feast of St Philip and St James, the patrons saints of the city.

- Location within Italy Location within Apulia
- Coordinates: 40°1′N 18°24′E
- Country: Italy
- Region: Apulia
- Province: Lecce (LE)
- Frazioni: Marittima, Marina di Marittima

Government
  - Mayor: Antonella Carrozzo

Area
  - Total: 11.42 km^{2} (4.41 sq mi)
- Elevation: 99 m (325 ft)

Population (31 July 2017)
  - Total: 2,960
  - Density: 259/km^{2} (671/sq mi)
- Demonym: Disini
- Time zone: UTC+1 (CET)
  - Summer (DST): UTC+2 (CEST)
- Postal code: 73030
- Dialing code: 0836
- ISTAT code: 075027
- Patron saint: St. Philip and St. James
- Saint day: 1 May
- Website: www.comune.diso.le.it

Diso (Salentino: Disu; Greek: Dhyssos) is a town and comune in the province of Lecce in the Apulia region of south-east Italy.

It has existed since the early 11th century, and features several churches, buildings and squares.
