= Hamilton Revelle =

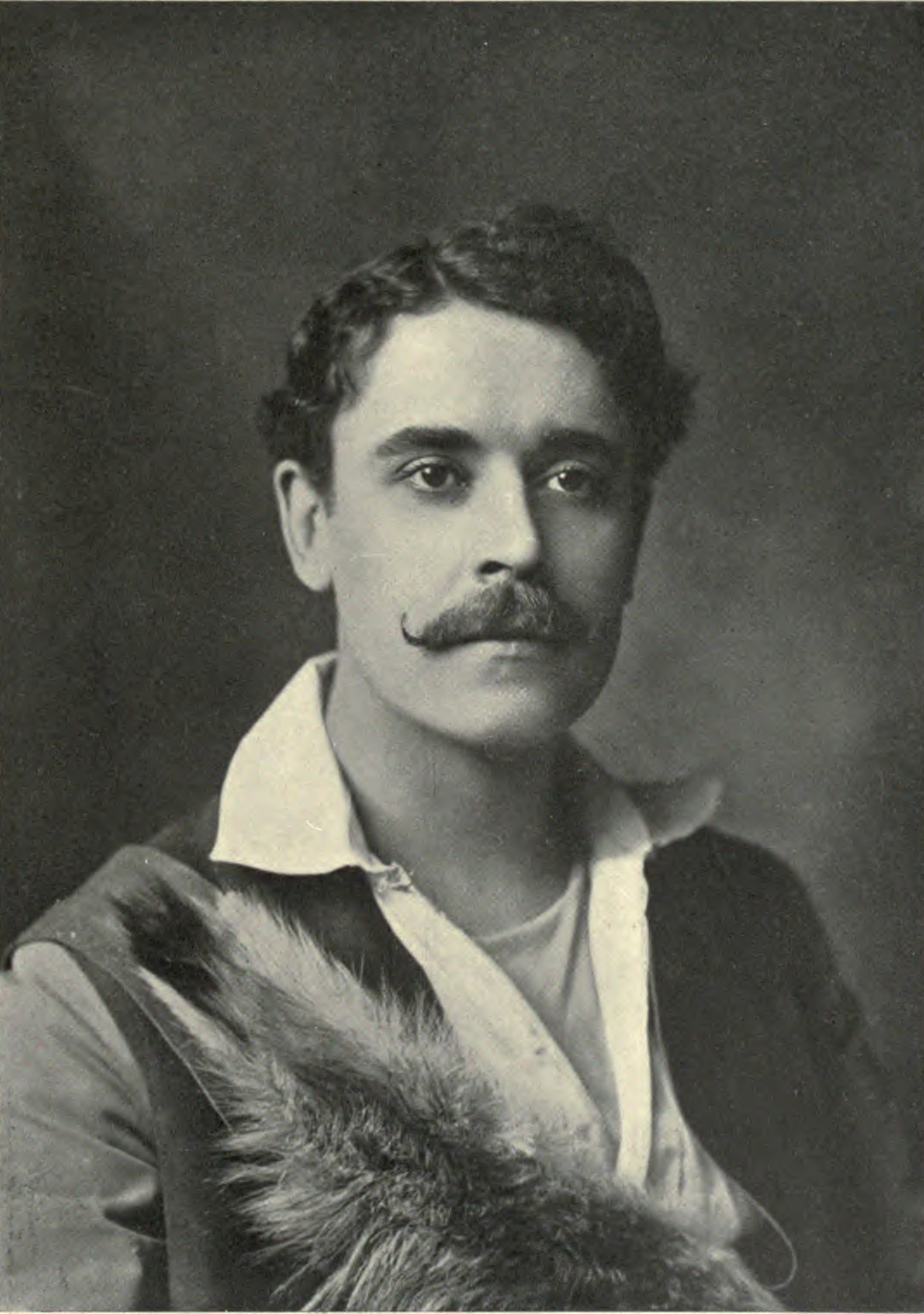
- Born: Arthur Lloyd Hamilton Engstrom; 31 May 1867; Moorish Castle, Gibraltar
- Died: 11 April 1958 (aged 90); Nice, Alpes-Maritimes, France
- Occupation: Actor
- Years active: 1890s to 1927

Hamilton Revelle (31 May 1867 – 11 April 1958) was a British-born stage and later silent screen actor.

== Biography ==
He was born Arthur Lloyd Hamilton Engstrom at Moorish Castle in Gibraltar, an overseas territory of the United Kingdom. His parents were George Lloyd Engström, an officer in the Royal Horse Artillery, and his wife Louisa Maria Revell.

Revelle famously was arrested on 5 March 1900, along with his female co-star Olga Nethersole, for performing the play Sapho which was considered salacious for the time for its depiction of a woman who has love affairs with men to whom she is not married. Their theatre was padlocked by the New York Police. Two plays replaced Sapho, The Second Mrs. Tanqueray and The Profligate. Eventually, the two were freed and the play was allowed to continue. The trial for Sapho and Nethersole began on 3 April 1900 and Nethersole and Revelle were acquitted on 7 April. The play was allowed to continue. The following year, 1901, he costarred with Mrs. Leslie Carter in "Du Barry".

== Filmography ==
- Doctor Antonio (1914)
- The Last of the Caldieros (1914)*short
- Hamlet (1914)
- DuBarry (1915) w/Mrs. Leslie Carter
- The Masque of Life (1915)
- Cuore ed arte (1915)
- An Enemy to Society (1915)
- The Price of Malice (1916)
- Monna Vanna (1916)
- The Half Million Bribe (1916)
- Ultima rappresentazione di gala del circo Wolfson (1916)
- The Black Stork (1917)
- Thais (1917) with Mary Garden
- Lest We Forget (1918)
- The Splendid Sinner (1918)
- A Star Over Night (1919) *short
- Kismet (1920) with Otis Skinner
- Good Women (1921)
- The Telephone Girl (1927)
