= Lest We Forget (1918 film) =

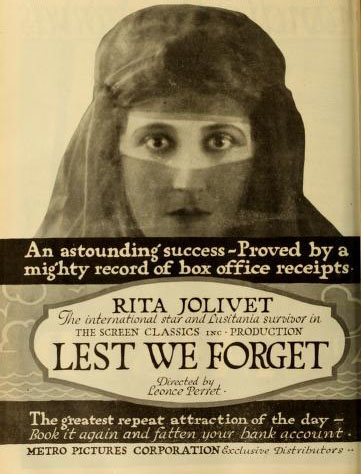
- period poster
- Directed by: Léonce Perret; Clifford Saum (2nd director)
- Written by: Léonce Perret (scenario); Tom Bret (subtitles editor)
- Produced by: Rita Jolivet; Count Giuseppe de Cippico (Jolivet's husband); J. L. Kempner
- Starring: Rita Jolivet
- Cinematography: Lucien Andriot
- Edited by: Charles A. Taylor
- Distributed by: Metro Pictures (picture branded A Metro Special)
- Release date: January 27, 1918
- Running time: 7-8 reels
- Country: United States
- Language: Silent (English intertitles)

Lest We Forget is a 1918 American World War I espionage silent drama film directed by Leonce Perret and produced by and starring Rita Jolivet. The film was released by the Metro Pictures company. While the picture is essentially a spy film, it may also be considered a propaganda film popular during World War I.

== Plot ==
The film was a live action film about the 1915 Lusitania sinking (as opposed to Windsor McKay's animated film The Sinking of the Lusitania (1918)). Actress Rita Jolivet was a survivor of the sinking and much of what is known about the last moments of her producer/employer Charles Frohman is related from her. This film made famous his last words, "..Why fear death for it is the most beautiful adventure in life."

== Cast ==
- Rita Jolivet as Rita Heriot
- Hamilton Revelle as Harry Winslow
- L. Rogers Lytton as Baron von Bergen
- Kate Blancke as Madame Heriot
- Clifford Saum as Fritz Muller
- Emil Roe as Mayor Le Roux
- Henry Smith as General Joffre
- Gaby Perrier as Young Mother
- Texas Cooper
- H. P. St. Leger
- Ernest Maupain

== Reception ==
Like many American films of the time, Lest We Forget was subject to cuts by city and state film censorship boards. For example, the Chicago Board of Censors required cuts of, in Reel 1, the intertitle "Why marry her?", Reel 3, that part of the scene in the telegraph office where officer throws young woman over table and is shown bending over her, Reel 4, the intertitle "Go, all of you — I will avenge this", and, Reel 7, the cutting of telephone wires.

== Preservation status ==
The film survives in a fragment at the George Eastman Museum Motion Picture Collection with more complete copies at the Library of Congress and Cinémathèque française.
