= Ballerina (1950 film) =

1950 film

- Directed by: Ludwig Berger
- Written by: Ludwig Berger
- Produced by: Louis Wipf
- Starring: Violette Verdy; Gabrielle Dorziat; Henri Guisol
- Cinematography: Robert Lefebvre
- Edited by: Jacques Poitrenaud
- Music by: Roger Désormière
- Production companies: Memnon Films; Lux Compagnie Cinématographique de France
- Distributed by: Lux Compagnie Cinématographique de France
- Release date: 6 December 1950
- Running time: 95 minutes
- Country: France
- Language: French

Ballerina is a 1950 French drama film directed by Ludwig Berger and starring Violette Verdy, Gabrielle Dorziat and Henri Guisol. It was produced and distributed by the French branch of Lux Film. The film's sets were designed by the art director Robert Gys. It was the final cinema film of the German director Berger, who moved into directing in television. Choreographed by Yvonne Georgi. It also known by the alternative title Dream Ballerina or Poor Little Ballerina.

== Synopsis ==
A young ballerina makes her on the stage of the theatre in her local French town, but is distracted and performs poorly. That night she dreams a series of various scenarios about a young male tearaway who has shown an interest in her. The following night she gives a perfect second performance.

== Summary ==
Feature-length fantasy in which a young ballet dancer (Violette Verdy) tries through ballet-dreams to decide between her fiancé, a stodgy jeweler, a mysterious adventurer who claims to love her, and her career as a dancer. Includes numerous ballet sequences, among them performances of an oriental ballet and several dream ballets. Verdy and Orloff lead the dancing cast. English version of a motion picture filmed at the Boulogne Studios in Paris, France. A Memnon Films production. Also shown in the U.S. under the titles: Dream Ballerina, and Poor Little Ballerina. Violette Verdy (Nicole), Gabrielle Dorziat (her aunt), Henri Guisol (the jeweler), Philippe Nicaud (Lou), Nicholas Orloff (Russian dancer), Romney Brent (the manager), Margo Lion (his wife), Jean Mercure (ballet master), Micheline Boudet (Marion), Sergeol (inspector), and others. French National Radio Orchestra (O.R.T.F.) conducted by Roger Désormière featuring the music of Wolfgang Amadeus Mozart and Maurice Ravel.

== Cast ==
- Violette Verdy as Nicole
- Gabrielle Dorziat as Aunt
- Henri Guisol as Jeweler
- Philippe Nicaud as Loulou
- Nicholas Orloff as Dancer
- Romney Brent as Director
- Jean Mercure as Dancer
- Micheline Boudet as Marie
- Margo Lion as l'épouse du directeur
- Pierre Sergeol as l'inspecteur

== Bibliography ==
- Huckenpahler, Victoria. Ballerina: A Biography of Violette Verdy. Audience Arts, 1978.
