= Henri Guisol =

French actor

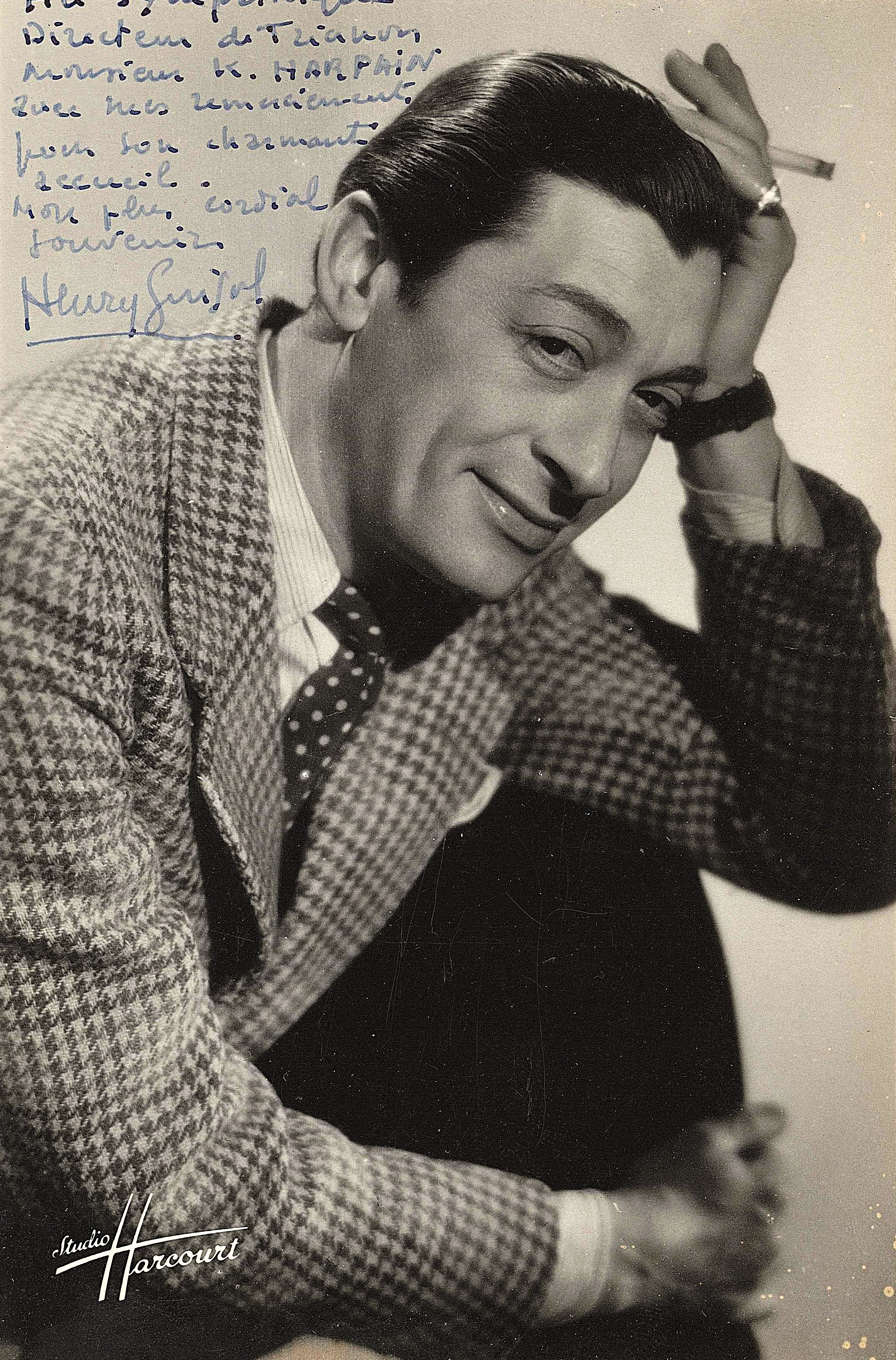
- Born: 12 October 1904; Aix-en-Provence, France
- Died: 11 May 1994 (aged 89); Saint-Raphaël, Var, France
- Occupation: Actor
- Years active: 1931–1980

Henri Guisol (12 October 1904 – 11 May 1994) was a French film actor. He appeared in more than seventy films from 1931 to 1980. He enjoyed a career in French who done its and film noir.

== Filmography ==
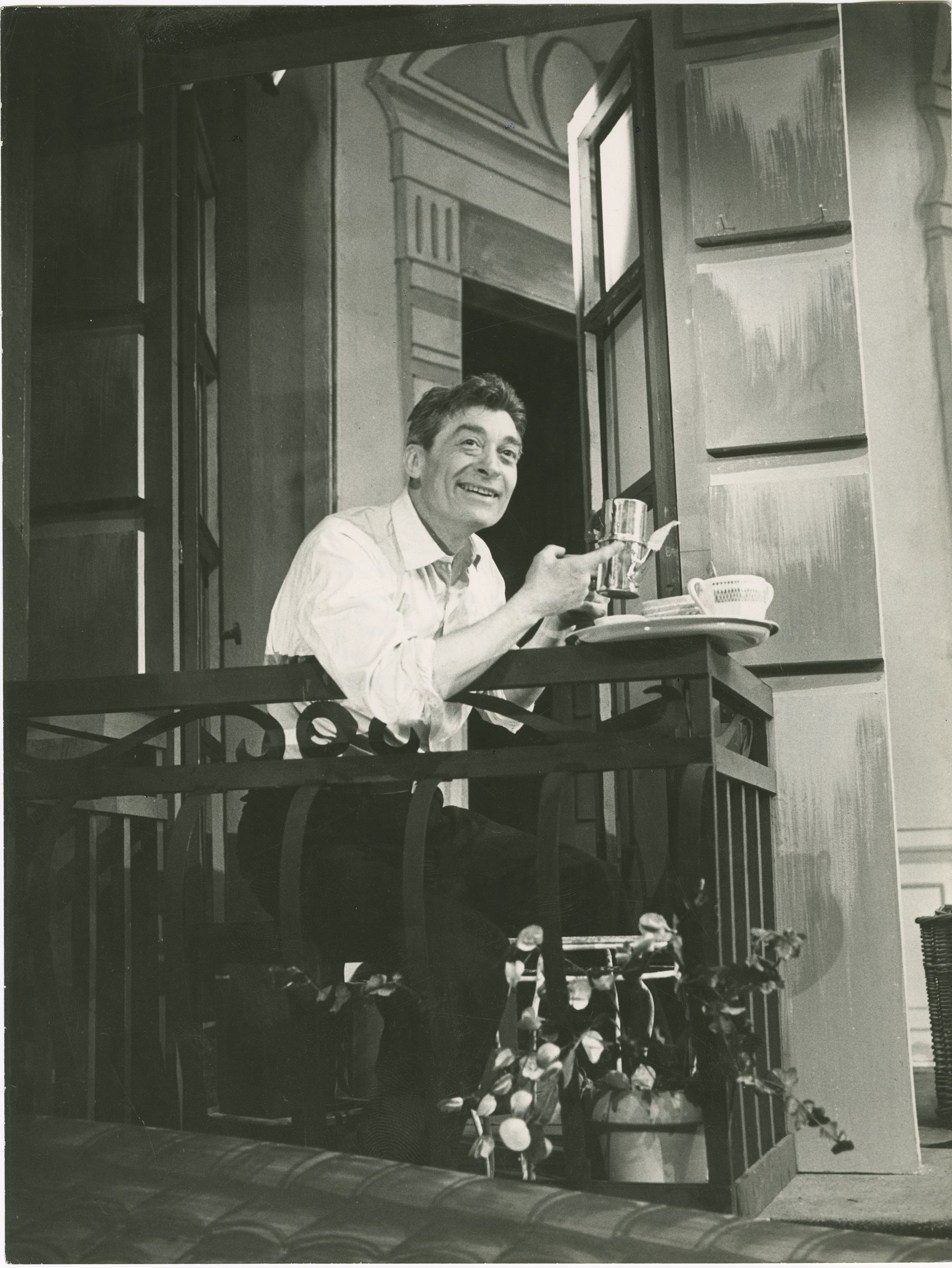
Henri Guisol in a scene from Sacre Fantomes (French version of the comedy Questi fantasmi!). Théâtre du Vieux-Colombier, Paris, 1958.

Film
Year	Title	Role	Notes
1931	La Chienne	Amédée - le garçon de café	Uncredited
1935	The Green Domino		
1936	The Crime of Monsieur Lange	The Son Meunier	
1936	Rose	Antonin	
1936	Les amants terribles	Victor	
1936	Les gais lurons	Stoddard	
1937	Vous n'avez rien à déclarer ?	Coco de la Baule	
1937	The Messenger	Jack	
1937	Double Crime in the Maginot Line	Lieutenant Capelle	
1937	Bizarre, Bizarre	Buffington	
1938	A Foolish Maiden		
1938	Three Waltzes	Brunner fils	
1938	The Novel of Werther	Schertz - le greffier	
1939	The World Will Tremble	Le Docteur	
1939	L'entraîneuse	Robert	
1939	La Loi du Nord	Le docteur Milo	
1940	Tempête	Charlie	
1940	Tobie est un ange		
1941	Vénus aveugle	Ulysse	
1942	Macao	Almaido	
1942	The Murderer is Afraid at Night	Bébé-Fakir	
1942	Promise to a Stranger	Duvernier	
1942	Six Little Girls in White	Arsène	
1943	Women in the Night	Gustave	
1943	Two Timid Souls	Anatole Garadou	
1943	Madame et le mort	Armand Le Noir	
1943	Retour de flamme	Constant	
1944	Portrait of a Woman	Le médecin	
1945	Box of Dreams	Pierre Forestier	
1945	L'extravagante mission	Robert Dupont	
1945	Dorothée cherche l'amour	André Vincent	
1946	Christine Gets Married	Olivier - le journaliste	
1946	Une femme coupée en morceaux		
1946	Once is Enough	Bernard Ancelin	
1947	The Secret of Florida	Le chef	
1947	Third at Heart	Jasmin	
1948	3ème cheminée sur la gauche	Monsieur Charles	
1948	Métier de fous	Claude Martin	
1949	Ces dames aux chapeaux verts	Ulysse	
1949	Thus Finishes the Night	Le procureur Georges Beryl	
1950	Lady Paname	Jeff - un compositeur de chansons	
1950	Bed for Two; Rendezvous with Luck	Robert Bobin	
1950	Ballerina	Jeweler	
1951	The Billionaire Tramp	Olivier Cabrol	
1951	Paris Is Always Paris	M. Morand	
1953	Midnight Witness	Jacques Montet	
1954	Theodora, Slave Empress	John the Cappadocian	
1954	La rafle est pour ce soir	Jean Dupont	
1954	Le fil à la patte	Claude Bertrand	
1955	Fruits of Summer	Edouard Gravières	
1955	Lola Montès	Horseman Maurice	
1957	Les Collégiennes	Christian Brenner	
1960	Murder at 45 R.P.M.	Georges Meliot	
1961	The Count of Monte Cristo	L'abbé Faria	
1976	La situation est grave... mais pas désespérée	Comte Alexandre de Valrude	
