= Rita Jolivet =

American-born British actress

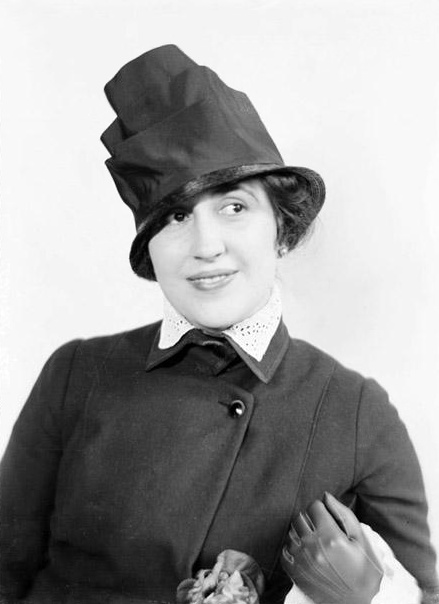
- Rita Jolivet, 1918
- Born: Marguerite Lucile Jolivet; September 25, 1884; Castleton, Richmond County, New York, U.S.
- Died: March 2, 1971 (aged 86); Nice, France
- Other name: Countess Marguerita de Cippico
- Occupation: Actress
- Years active: 1910–1926
- Spouses: Alfred Charles Stern (m. 1908, divorced); Count Giuseppe de Cippico (m. 1916, divorced); James “Jimmy” Bryces-Allan (m. 1928; death 1961)

Marguerite Lucile Jolivet (25 September 1884 – 2 March 1971), known professionally as Rita Jolivet, was a British actress in theatre and silent films in the early 20th century. She was known in private life as the Countess Marguerita de Cippico.

== Origins and Family ==
Jolivet was born on 25 September 1884 in Castleton, Richmond County, New York, one of the three children of Charles Eugene Jolivet (1840–1920), an owner of extensive vineyards in France, and French-born Pauline Hélène Vaillant (1857–1957), a talented musician who retired from the concert stage after marrying in 1879.

Jolivet had a sister, Inez Henriette, and a brother, Alfred Eugene. Her great-great-grandmother was the only member of her family to avoid the guillotine during the French Revolution. Her grandmother Vaillant was among the beautés de Cour in the court of Napoleon III.

Jolivet was the great-grandaunt of the Canadian actor Finn Wolfhard. His mother was the granddaughter of Jolivet's brother Alfred.

== Social prominence ==
Jolivet was an intimate of the inner society circles in London and a close friend of the family of Lord Lowther, the British ambassador to Turkey. Her sister was noted violinist Inez Henriette Jolivet. Inez performed at the Metropolitan Opera House in New York and was decorated by both King Edward VII and Czar Nicholas II.

== Theatre ==
She began her stage career as a youth, making her London debut in Much Ado About Nothing. Jolivet also played Juliet for producer William Poel of London, in Romeo and Juliet. Poel maintained a company of players which performed in university towns in Britain, giving performances of Shakespeare. Jolivet was a pupil of Mademoiselle Thenaud, who had been a leading actress of the Comédie-Française and who was a personal palm reader to Queen Victoria. In 1910, Jolivet was the leading lady in George Alexander's play The Eccentric Lord Comberdene.

Jolivet played the role of Marsinah in the first American stage production, produced by Harrison Grey Fiske, of Kismet in 1911. The principal role of Hajj, the beggar, was played by Otis Skinner. Kismet was staged at the Knickerbocker Theatre in March 1912. Jolivet was in the cast of A Thousand Years Ago by Percy MacKaye, presented at the Shubert Theatre in January 1914.

== RMS Lusitania survivor ==
Jolivet was a passenger on the RMS Lusitania on 7 May 1915, when it was torpedoed by a German U-boat and sank in the Atlantic Ocean off the coast of Ireland, 19 kilometres (12 mi) off the Old Head of Kinsale. Jolivet was standing on the bridge with Charles Frohman, a theatrical producer who was grooming her for stardom, when the liner went down. Frohman's final words to her, quoting his favourite play, Peter Pan: "Why fear death? It is the most beautiful adventure in life." Jolivet climbed onto a chair and obtained a life preserver that was in her stateroom. She was saved with others when boats arrived from Ireland, one of them was the S.S. Westborough, disguised as a Greek steamer named Katrina. She had been a rising star, both in Frohman's theatrical productions and in silent films, however after Frohman's death her theatrical career essentially came to a halt.

Jolivet testified in the Federal District Court during a hearing regarding a petition of the Cunard Steamship Company, which owned the Lusitania. The company was seeking a limitation of liabilities for the deaths and damage which occurred from the tragedy. Jolivet's brother-in-law, George L. Vernon, was drowned on the Lusitania. He was going to join his wife, Jolivet's sister, Inez Vernon, who was residing in Europe.

Inez became depressed following her husband's death and committed suicide by shooting herself at Sumner Apartments, 31 West 11th Street, New York City on 28 July 1915.

In November 1919, Jolivet's younger brother, Alfred, married 29-year-old American Beatrice Witherbee, who was also a Lusitania survivor. Beatrice's mother, Mary Cummins Brown, and her three-year-old son, Alfred Scott Witherbee Jr., died in the sinking, and she never publicly discussed the tragedy.

== Marriages ==
On 14 November 1908 Jolivet married Alfred Charles Stern, but the marriage soon failed. On 27 January 1916 she married her second husband, Italian nobleman Count Giuseppe de Cippico, at Kew Gardens, Surrey. He had a son from a previous marriage. Cippico and Jolivet had no children together, and the marriage ended in divorce.

After the divorce, Lady Allan (the wife of Sir Hugh Montagu Allan of Ravenscrag, Montreal), another survivor of the Lusitania, introduced Jolivet to James "Jimmy" Bryce Allan, her husband's popular Scottish cousin. He was living at “The Cliff”, Wemyss Bay, Renfrewshire, the son of Captain Bryce Allan of Ballikinrain Castle, Stirlingshire, and his wife, the daughter of Stewart Clark (1830–1907) MP, DL, of Dundas Castle, South Queensferry; and grandson of James Allan of Glasgow, older brother of Sir Hugh. Jimmy Bryce Allan was a nephew of Sir John Stewart-Clark and Sir Thomas Dixon, 2nd Baronet. Their marriage at the Church of Scotland in Paris on 26 April 1928 was "celebrated with much fanfare". The reception was held at Ballikinrain Castle (a 4,000-acre (16 km^{2}) estate, which employed 50 servants), and which Allan subsequently leased.

After World War II the couple took up travelling again and sold Ballinkinrain to move to a smaller castle in Scotland, where they threw parties with royalty, heads of state and many other famous people on their lengthy guest lists.

== Film career ==
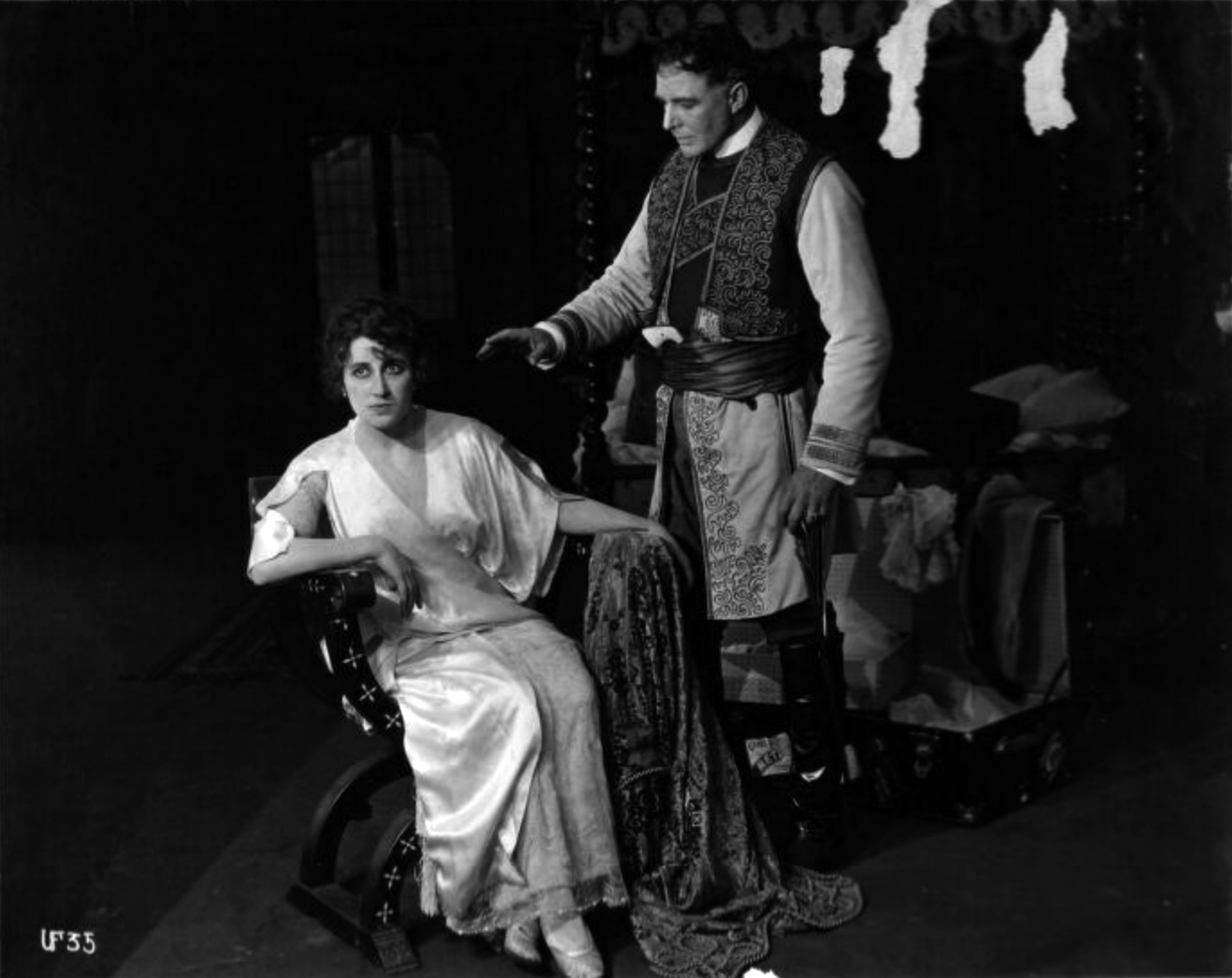
Rita Jolivet and House Peters in The Unafraid (1915)

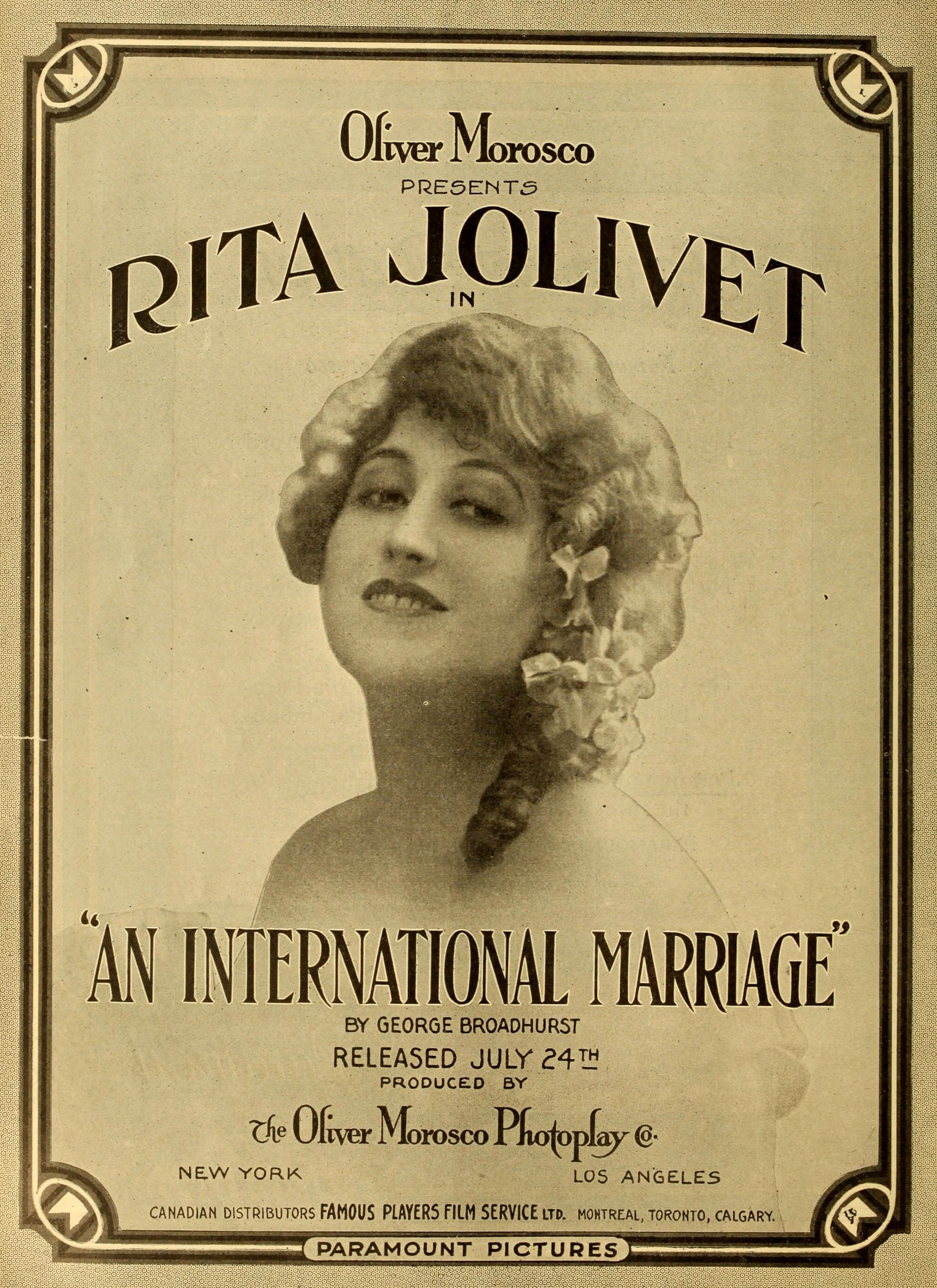
An International Marriage (1916)

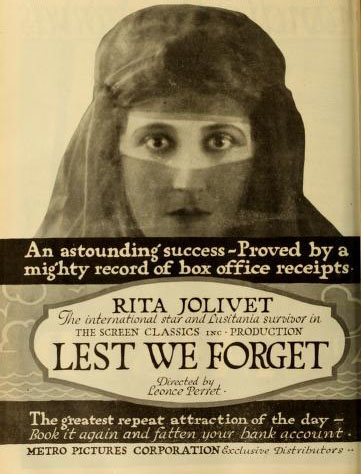
Lest We Forget (1918)

Jolivet preferred film work to theatre in some respects, because the silent drama allowed her "more scope for dramatic expression." Her film career started in Italy with the Ambrosia Company. She made Fata Morgana (1914), Zvani (1915), L'Onore di Morire (1915), La Mano di Fatma (1915), and Cuore ed arte (1915). She returned to Italy to make Teodora (1921), in which she portrayed the Empress Theodora in a famous romance by the French dramatist Victorien Sardou; historians disagree about the character of the wife of the Emperor Justinian, but the film depicted both her as beautiful and charming. It was first shown in American cinemas in 1922.

Jolivet went to America and was affiliated to Famous Players–Lasky. Her first Hollywood film was The Unafraid in 1914.

In 1917 Jolivet and Vincent Serrano made One Law for Both; the drama, directed by Ivan Abramson, illustrated the "secret and stirring methods of revolutionaries". It is now presumed lost.

Jolivet and her husband Count Giuseppe de Cippico donated the proceeds from Lest We Forget (1918) to 'the alleviation of suffering caused by World War I.' She was an avid Liberty Bond booster, and it was reported that she sold more of them throughout the United States than Douglas Fairbanks, Sr, Charlie Chaplin and Mary Pickford combined. In a single week in May 1918 Jolivet sold more than $5,000,000 in Liberty Bonds in Baltimore, Maryland.

Lest We Forget was shown in Washington, D.C., with Jolivet addressing audiences before three of its screenings. She told the audiences of her riveting personal experiences since the war began in August 1914, when she was in France. In the film she plays Rita Heriot, a Paris soprano who is rescued from the RMS Lusitania sinking after playing an engagement at the Metropolitan Theatre in New York.

Jolivet continued making films in France and Italy through 1926. The filmography of her later screen work includes the titles The Bride's Confession (1921), Roger la Honte (1922), Messalina (1924), Phi-Phi (1926) and Le Marchand de bonheur (1926), after which she retired from the screen

== Death ==
Jolivet died in Nice, France in 1971. Although she claimed to be 77 on her deathbed, she was almost ten years older than that.

== Selected filmography ==
- The Unafraid (1915)
- The Masque of Life (1915–16)
- Monna Vanna (1915)
- An International Marriage (1916)
- Lest We Forget (1918)
- Theodora (1921)
- Roger la Honte (1922)
- Messalina (1924)

== See also ==
- Dorothy Gibson, American actress and Titanic survivor
