= The Masque of Life =

The Masque of Life (Le Cirque de la Mort)
- Directed by: Alfred Lind
- Written by: Alfred Lind
- Produced by: Alfred Lind; Armando Vey
- Starring: Hamilton Revelle; Emmo Semmori; Rita Jolivet
- Cinematography: Alfred Lind; Charles Paulus
- Edited by: Alfred Lind
- Distributed by: Signet Films
- Release date: 1916
- Running time: 7 reels (US); 10 reels (Italian)
- Country: Italy
- Language: Silent

The Masque of Life is a 1916 thrill picture, made during World War I, centering around circus life and a kingdom. It was directed by Alfred Lind with an international cast with familiar names Hamilton Revelle and Rita Jolivet starring in the film.

== Cast ==
- Hamilton Revelle – Pierrot
- Emmo Semmori – Giovanni Randolfi
- Rita Jolivet – Perrette
- Käthe Morrison – Anne Randolfi
- Carmen Tarello – Marie Randolfi – beider Tochter
- Mia Romeli – Grafin Tamari
- Luigi Cassolini – Guido – ihr sohn
- Caine Cavallo – Charly Dauphin – ihr Neffe
- Fredo Baxter – Ernesto Morgan – Zirkusdirector
- John Thompson – Border – ein Neger
- [ [Robert Florey]] – John Chatle – der Detektiv
- Trude Nick – Dienstmädchen
- Francisque Caill – Polizist
- Deligny – Polizist
- Jacques Faure -
- Miss Evelyn – Evelyn
- Pete Montebello – a chimpanzee actor
