= Alfred Lind =

Danish screenwriter and director (1879–1959)

- Born: Søren Estrup Alfred Lind; 27 March 1879; Helsingør, Denmark
- Died: 29 April 1959 (aged 80); Copenhagen, Denmark
- Other name: Sören Estrup Alfred Lind
- Occupations: Film Director; Cinematographer; Screenwriter
- Years active: 1906–1929

Søren Estrup Alfred Lind (27 March 1879 – 29 April 1959) was a Danish cinematographer, screenwriter, and film director of the silent era. Lind was a prominent director in early Scandinavian cinema, and also worked in the German film industry. He is believed to have shot the earliest surviving footage of Iceland from 1906.

== Selected filmography ==
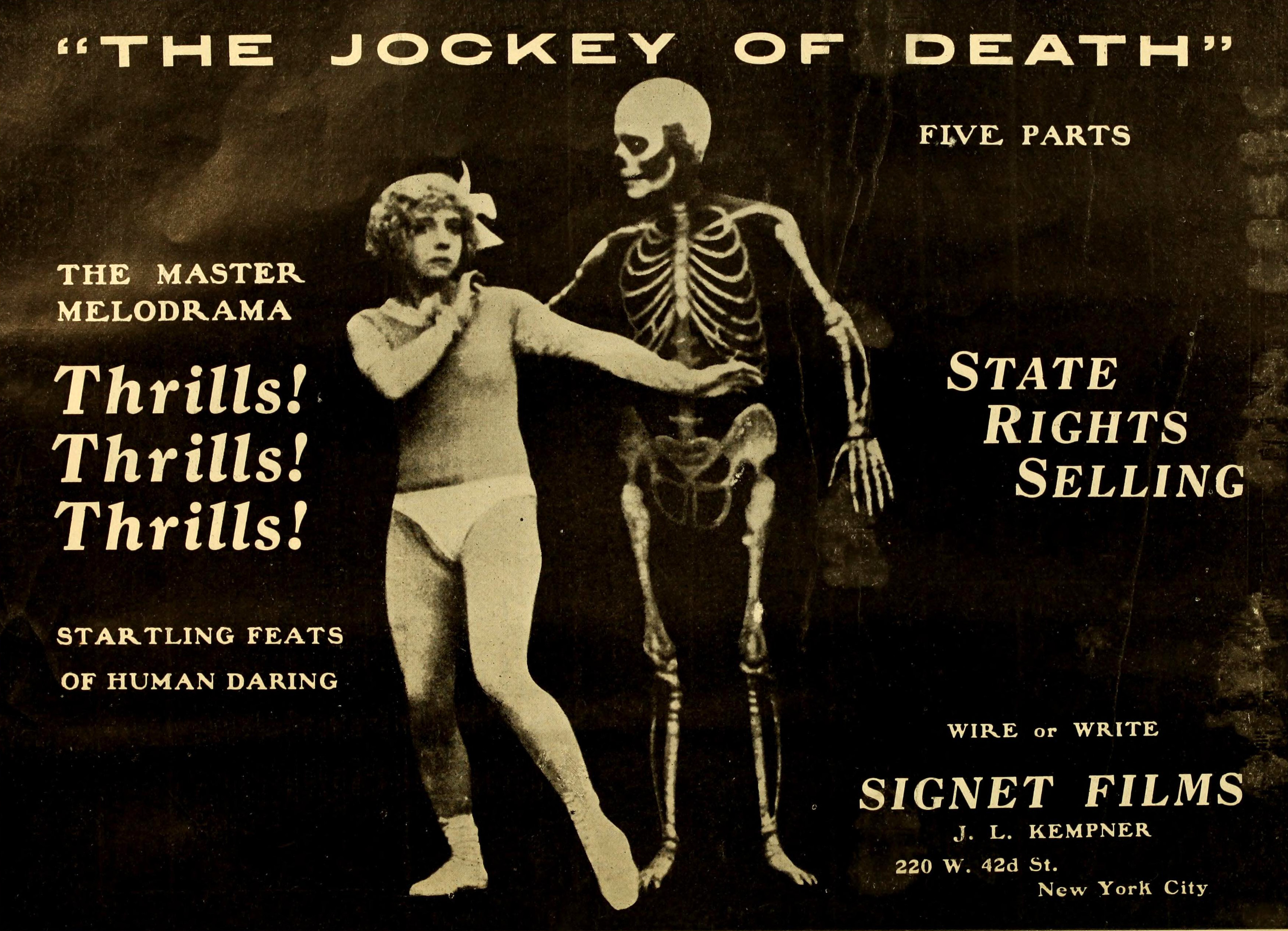
The Jockey of Death (1916)

=== Director ===
- Den hvide slavehandels sidste offer (1911)
- The Masque of Life (1915–1916)
- Alkohol (1919)
- Tragedy at the Royal Circus (1928)
- Girls Do Not Joke (1929)

=== Cinematographer ===
- The Abyss (1910)
- Four Devils (1911)
- The Masque of Life (1915–1916)

== Bibliography ==
- Aitken, Ian. The Concise Routledge Encyclopedia of the Documentary Film. Routledge, 2011.
- Abel, Richard. Encyclopedia of Early Cinema. Taylor & Francis, 2005.
- Bock, Hans-Michael & Bergfelder, Tim. The Concise CineGraph. Encyclopedia of German Cinema. Berghahn Books, 2009.
