= Theodora (1921 film) =

1921 film

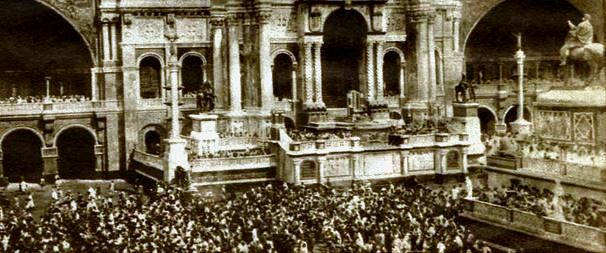
- Directed by: Leopoldo Carlucci
- Written by: Victorien Sardou (play)
- Starring: Rita Jolivet and Emilia Tosini
- Edited by: Katherine Hilliker (subtitles)
- Production company: Ambrosio-Zanotta
- Release date: 14 October 1921
- Country: Italy

Theodora (Italian: Teodora) is a 1921 Italian silent film dramatization of the life of the Byzantine empress Theodora.

== Plot ==
Theodora, a Roman courtesan and former slave girl, marries the Byzantine emperor Justinian and assumes the throne as Empress of Rome. However, a love affair with a handsome Greek leads to revolution and armed conflict in both Byzantium and Rome.

== Cast ==
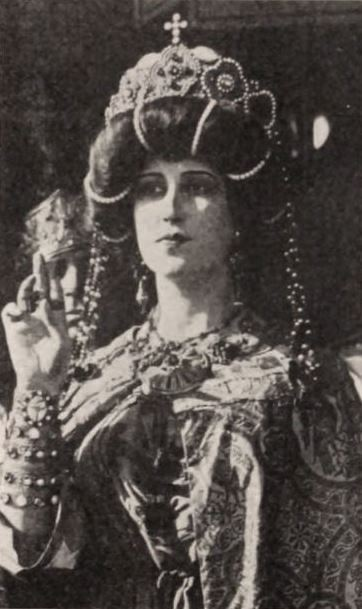
Rita Jolivet

- Rita Jolivet as Teodora Augusta
- Ferruccio Biancini as Justinian
- René Maupré as Andreas
- Emilia Rosini as Antonina
- Adolfo Trouché as Belisarius
- Mariano Bottino as Marcellus
- Guido Marciano as Boia principale
- Marie Belfiore as Tamyris
- Giovanni Motta as Buzes
- Leo Sorinello as Mara
- G. Rosetti as Amru
- Luigi Rinaldi as Calcante
- Alfredo as Philo
- Alfredo Bertoncelli as Euphrata
- Giuliano Gardini as Cospiratore
- François Renard as Cospiratore
- Pietro Ferrari as Cospiratore
- Alberto Belfiore as Cospiratore

== Production ==
To aid the directorial staff, miniatures of all the sets to be constructed were made, allowing the staff to work out the grouping of the thousands of extras and the camera angles and lighting for the scenes.

== See also ==
- List of historical drama films
- Late Antiquity
