= Part Time Wife (1930 film) =

1930 film

- Theatrical release poster
- Directed by: Leo McCarey
- Screenplay by: Howard J. Green; Leo McCarey; Raymond L. Schrock
- Starring: Edmund Lowe; Leila Hyams; Tommy Clifford; Walter McGrail; Louis Payne; Sam Lufkin
- Cinematography: George Schneiderman
- Edited by: Jack Murray
- Production company: Fox Film Corporation
- Distributed by: Fox Film Corporation
- Release date: December 28, 1930
- Running time: 72 minutes
- Country: United States
- Language: English

Part Time Wife is a 1930 American pre-Code comedy film directed by Leo McCarey and written by Howard J. Green, Leo McCarey and Raymond L. Schrock. The film stars Edmund Lowe, Leila Hyams, Tommy Clifford, Walter McGrail, Louis Payne and Sam Lufkin. The film was released on December 28, 1930, by Fox Film Corporation.

== Plot ==
Jim Murdock's marriage is in trouble after he neglects his wife, particularly her attraction to golf. With tips from Irish caddy Tommy Milligan on how to play the game on the course and at home, Jim challenges his estranged wife to a match and demonstrates that he's a changed man.

== Cast ==
- Edmund Lowe as Jim B. Murdock
- Leila Hyams as Mrs. Murdock
- Tommy Clifford as Tommy Milligan
- Walter McGrail as Johnny Spence
- Louis Payne as Deveney
- Sam Lufkin as Caddie Master
- Bodil Rosing as Martha
