= Theodora, Slave Empress =

- Directed by: Riccardo Freda
- Screenplay by: Rene Wheeler; Claude Accursi; Ranieri Cochetti; Riccardo Freda
- Story by: André-Paul Antoin; Riccardo Freda
- Starring: Gianna Maria Canale; Georges Marchal; Renato Baldini; Henri Guisol
- Cinematography: Rodolfo Lombardi
- Edited by: Mario Serandrei
- Music by: Renzo Rossellini
- Production companies: Lux Film; Lux Compagnie Cinématographique de France
- Distributed by: Lux Film (Italy); Lux Compagnie Cinématographique de France (France)
- Release date: 29 September 1954 (Italy)
- Running time: 92 minutes
- Countries: Italy; France
- Box office: ₤592 million

Theodora, Slave Empress (Italian: Teodora, imperatrice di Bisanzio) is a 1954 film about Theodora, a former slave who married Justinian I, emperor of Byzantium in AD 527–565. It was directed by Riccardo Freda.

== Cast ==
- Gianna Maria Canale as "Theodora"
- Georges Marchal as "Justinian I"
- Renato Baldini as "Arcal", Theodora's would-be lover
- Henri Guisol as "Giovanni di Cappadocia"
- Irene Papas as "Faida", Theodora's step-sister
- Olga Solbelli as "Egina", Theodora's step-mother
- Roger Pigaut as "Captain Andres"
- Nerio Bernardi as "General Belisarius"
- Carletto Sposito as "Scarpios"
- Alessandro Fersen as "The Metropolitan"

== Release ==
Theodora, Slave Empress was distributed theatrically in Italy on 29 September 1954 by Lux Film. It grossed a total of 592 million Italian lire on this domestic release.

It was also distributed in France by Lux Compagnie Cinématographique de France as Théodora, impératrice de Byzance. The film was the first of director Riccardo Freda's film to obtain a wide distribution outside Italy.

It was also released in the USA in December, 1954, distributed by Lux Film America as an I.F.E. release. For this occasion, the film was dubbed into English and edited to 88 minutes (from its original runtime of 124 minutes). The editing was accomplished by simply removing the middle 4 reels of film, covering the plotline from the marriage of Theodora and Justinian to the start of the nobility's revolt against Justinian and his reforms.

== Reception ==
In a contemporary review, The Monthly Film Bulletin spoke of the film in negative terms, calling it a "dispiriting experience". The piece referred to Freda's direction as "laboured", stating that he "brings neither gusto nor honest vulgarity to the narrative". Regarding the action scenes, the reviewer felt that only the chariot race was staged with "any suggestion of real flamboyancy or flair" and that Canale's erotic dance before Justinian was "painfully unexciting".

== See also ==
- List of historical drama films
- Late Antiquity
