= Louis Payne =

American actor (1873–1954)

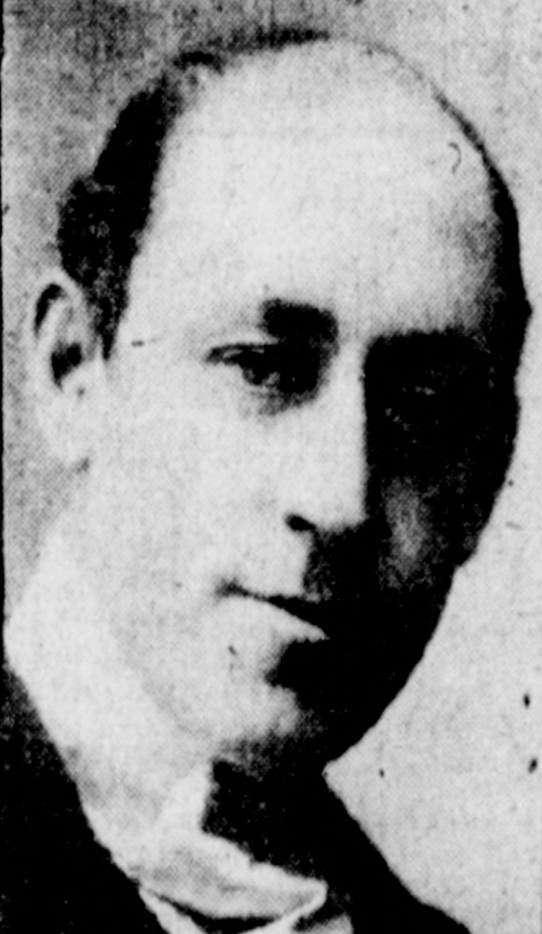
- Born: William Louis Payne; January 13, 1873; Pennsylvania, United States
- Died: August 14, 1953 (aged 80); Woodland Hills, California, United States
- Occupation: Actor
- Years active: 1915–1951
- Spouse: Mrs. Leslie Carter (m. 1906; died 1937)

William Louis Payne (January 13, 1873 – August 14, 1953) was an American character actor of the silent and sound film eras, as well as legitimate theater.

== Biography ==
Born in Pennsylvania, Payne's acting life began in the first decade of the 1900s, when he appeared in the Broadway play, Her Majesty, the Girl Queen of Nordenmark, which ran at the Manhattan Theatre in 1900. In 1903 he played Nathaniel Winkle in Mr. Pickwick at the Herald Square Theatre and later the Grand Opera House.

In 1906, he married famous stage actress Mrs. Leslie Carter, fifteen years her junior, and remained married to her until her death in 1937. He made his film debut in 1915's DuBarry, a film created to highlight Carter, who was a protégé of the playwright David Belasco. Belasco wrote the stage play of the same name on which the film is based, and in which Carter starred on Broadway. Payne appeared in over 40 films during his 35-year career in Hollywood, as well as doing numerous plays.

In 1940, three years after Carter's death, Warner Bros. produced a biopic on her life, Lady with Red Hair, on which Payne serves as a technical advisor. He continued to act in small roles through the 1940s. The final film in which Payne appeared was 1951's epic Quo Vadis, starring Robert Taylor and Deborah Kerr, in which he played one of Jesus' 12 apostles. Payne died on August 14, 1953, at the Motion Picture Country Home in Woodland Hills, California. He was buried with his wife at Woodland Cemetery and Arboretum in Dayton, Ohio.

== Filmography ==
(Per AFI database)

- DuBarry (1915)
- For Sale (1924)
- True as Steel (1924)
- So This Is Marriage (1924)
- Alias Mary Flynn (1925)
- As Man Desires (1925)
- The Fate of a Flirt (1925)
- The Lady Who Lied (1925)
- The Last Edition (1925)
- The Only Thing (1925)
- We Moderns (1925)
- The Blind Goddess (1926)
- The Outsider (1926)
- The Shamrock Handicap (1926)
- A Woman's Heart (1926)
- Broadway Madness (1927)
- The King of Kings (1927)
- Vanity (1927)
- The Yankee Clipper (1927)
- The Whip (1928)
- Evangeline (1929)
- Big News (1929)
- Interference (1929)
- The Dude Wrangler (1930)
- Lawful Larceny (1930)
- Part Time Wife (1930)
- Now I'll Tell (1934)
- Pride and Prejudice (1940)
- Look Who's Laughing (1941)
- Gildersleeve on Broadway (1943)
- Government Girl (1944)
- Heavenly Days (1944)
- The Woman in the Window (1944)
- Billy Rose's Diamond Horseshoe (1945)
- Saratoga Trunk (1945) as Raymond Soule (uncredited)
- From This Day Forward (1946)
- Joan of Arc (1948) as Judge Thibault (uncredited)
- Challenge to Lassie (1949)
- My Forbidden Past (1951)
- Quo Vadis (1951)
