= Monna Vanna (1915 film) =

- Directed by: Mario Caserini
- Produced by: Arturo Ambrosio
- Starring: Madeleine Céliat; Hamilton Revelle; François-Paul Donadio
- Production company: Società Anonima Ambrosio
- Distributed by: Società Anonima Ambrosio
- Release date: 1915
- Country: Italy
- Languages: Silent; Italian intertitles

Monna Vanna is a 1915 Italian silent film directed by Mario Caserini and starring Madeleine Céliat, Hamilton Revelle and François-Paul Donadio. It was released in the United States by Universal Pictures in 1916.

== Cast ==
- Madeleine Céliat
- Hamilton Revelle
- François-Paul Donadio
- Luigi Chiesa
- Maria Caserini
- Cesare Zocchi
- Umberto Scalpellini
- Rita Jolivet

== See also ==
- Monna Vanna (1922)

== Bibliography ==
- Aldo Bernardini & Vittorio Martinelli. Il cinema muto italiano, Volume 8, Part 2. Nuova ERI-Edizioni RAI, 1992.
