= Theodora (wife of Justinian I) =

Roman empress from 527 to 548

Theodora I
- Augusta
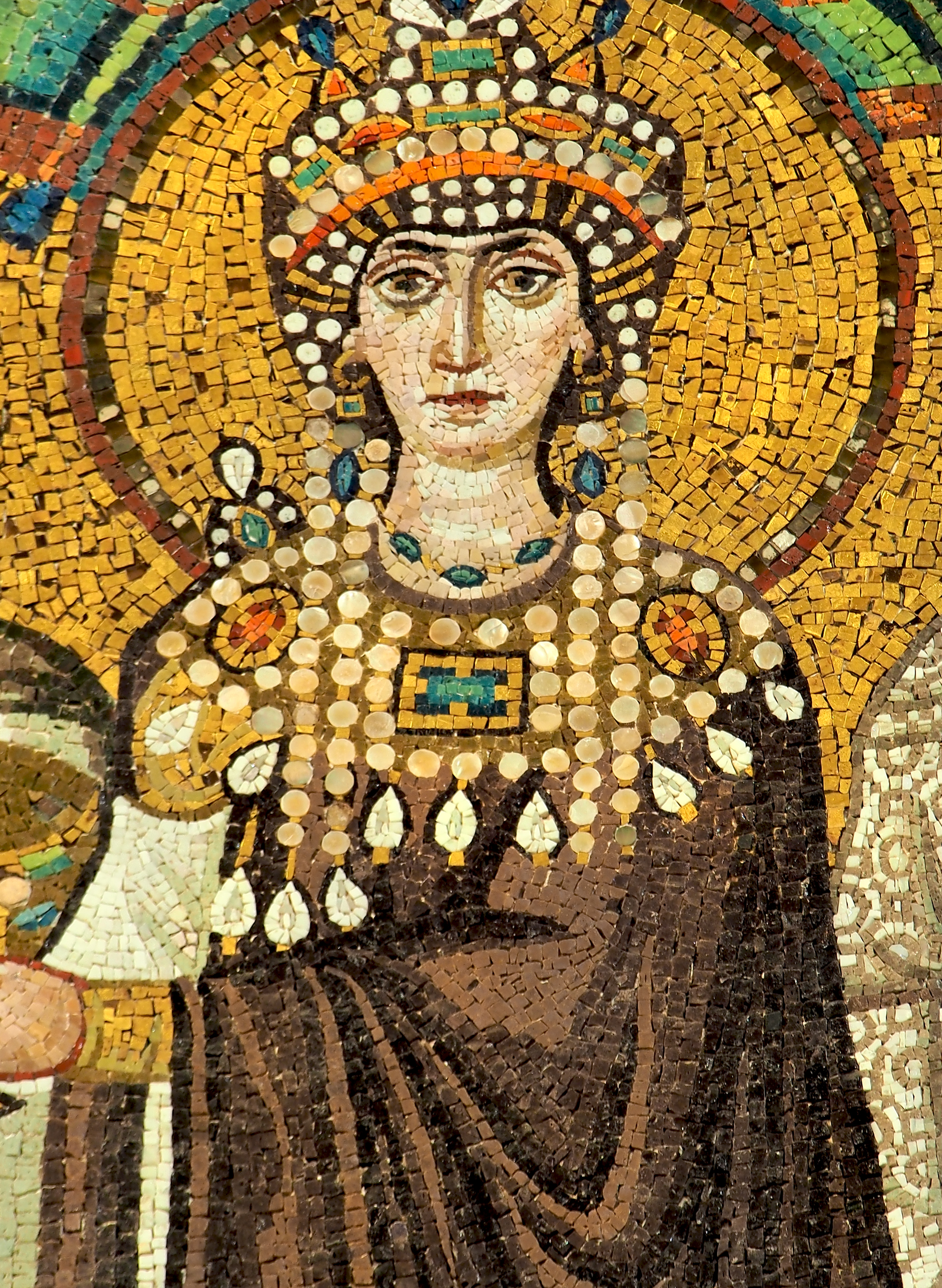
- Depiction from a contemporary portrait mosaic in the Basilica of San Vitale, Ravenna

Eastern Roman empress
- Tenure: 1 April 527 – 28 June 548
- Born: c. 490–500
- Died: 28 June 548; Constantinople, Byzantine Empire
- Burial: Church of the Holy Apostles
- Spouse: Justinian I
- Dynasty: Justinian
- Religion: Non-Chalcedonian Christianity

Theodora (/ˌθiːəˈdɔːrə/; Greek: Θεοδώρα; c. 490/500 – 28 June 548) (Note: Karagianni 2013, p. 22; Estimates of her birth date vary. According to Clive Foss, possible dates range from 485 to 512, but most likely 490 or a few years later. Britannica indicates ca. 497 ("Theodora," Britannica); and the Brooklyn Museum says ca. 500.) was the wife of emperor Justinian I and Eastern Roman empress from 527 until her death. Theodora was one of Justinian's chief political advisers. She is recognized as a saint in the Eastern Orthodox and Oriental Orthodox Churches, and commemorated on 14 November.

She was of humble origins, having been born to a bear-keeper in Constantinople. She worked as a courtesan and actress in her youth. She likely met Justinian sometime before 524. They subsequently married and Theodora was crowned empress when Justinian became emperor in 527.

She played a crucial role in the suppression of the Nika riots in 532. Theodora and Justinian ordered construction of many grand public works, including the Hagia Sophia. According to Procopius, she banished the brothel-keepers and set free the women. She also engaged in court intrigues, such as the exile of John the Cappadocian, and the exile and death of Pope Silverius and the elevation of Pope Vigilius. She and her husband supported opposite sides in the Chalcedonian schism between Christian Monophysites/Miaphysites and Chalcedonian Christianity, which led Justinian to be occasionally merciful to the Miaphysites despite being a Chalcedonian himself.

She died of cancer in 548. Much of the primary narrative of her life comes from the works of Procopius, who presents starkly diverging views in his public and private writings. Publicly, he wrote glowingly of her, but his Secret Histories portrays her as shameless, cruel and lustful, though loyal. Historians are divided as to the accuracy of Procopius's portrayals. Nevertheless, Theodora achieved lasting cultural interest, inspiring art, plays, operas, films, novels, and worship.

== Early years ==
Much of her early life, including the date and place of her birth, is uncertain: her birthplace has been proposed by later sources as Syria, Cyprus, Paphlagonia and Alexandria. The modern consensus seems to be that Theodora most likely was born around 495 and raised in Constantinople. Procopius's Secret History is the foremost source of her life before marriage, but some modern scholars regard it as often unreliable and slanderous. David Potter writes that Procopius' description of Theodora's erotic life "probably was composed as an exaggerated diatribe" and was "certainly not among the most accurate things he ever wrote."

Her father, Acacius, was a bear keeper for the Hippodrome's Green faction in Constantinople. Thus, modern scholars argue that it is highly probable Theodora was a native of the capital – this is furthered in Procopius' narrative. Her mother, whose name was not recorded, was a dancer and an actress. She had two sisters, an elder named Comito and a younger named Anastasia. The names of her family probably suggest an upbringing in a Greek-speaking, Christian household. After her father's death in her childhood, her mother remarried, but the family lacked a source of income because a Green official was bribed into giving away her stepfather's position. Consequently, her mother presented her children before the Hippodrome's crowd as suppliants to the Greens, but the Greens rebuffed her efforts. In contrast, the Blue faction took pity on the family and gave them the position.

According to Procopius' Secret History, Theodora began her work as an actress before the onset of adolescence and later joined Comito as a performer on stage. Procopius wrote that Theodora performed a pornographic portrayal of Leda and the Swan, where she would have birds eat seeds from her genitals. Employment as an actress at the time would have included performing "indecent exhibitions" on stage and providing sexual services off stage. Contemporaneous historian John of Ephesus also describes Theodora as having come "from the brothel" which gives credibility to Procopius portrayal. Additionally the Chronicle of Fredegar (7th century) mentions Belisarius and Justinian enjoying and later marrying two sisters from the Lupanar. Modern consensus about Theodora's sexual activity is that, as Potter states, underlying Procopius' inventions "there lies the semblance of fact." Nevertheless, Procopius' Secret History is particularly notable in the way it deliberately slanders Theodora's early life as a sexual deviant. Clive Foss underscores how Procopius portrayed Theodora as a "whore", not only exaggerating the number of lovers and abortions she had at this time of her life but also condemning her vanity.

Later, Theodora traveled to North Africa as the concubine of Hecebolus, who became the governor of the Libyan Pentapolis. Procopius alleges that their relationship dissolved after a quarrel in Africa. Theodora, "destitute of the means of life," went to Alexandria, Egypt. Some historians speculate that she met Miaphysite Patriarch Timothy III and converted to Miaphysitism there, but there is no reliable evidence that this happened. From Alexandria, she traveled to Antioch, where she met a Blue faction dancer called Macedonia who may have served as an informer for Justinian. Afterwards, Theodora returned to Constantinople where she met Justinian.

Justinian wanted to marry Theodora but law from Constantine's time barred the senatorial rank from marrying an actress. Empress Euphemia, wife of emperor Justin, also strongly opposed the marriage. Following Euphemia's death in 524, that same year Justin issued an edict allowing actresses to marry senators.

Theodora had an illegitimate daughter who produced three sons: Ioannes (John in English), Athanasius and Anastasius. The same law that allowed Justinian and Theodora to marry also excused children of former actresses, thus allowing Theodora's daughter to marry a relative of the late emperor Anastasius. Anastasius (consul 517) had a son with this daughter of Theodora, Areobindus, whose daughter, Anastasia Areobinda, married Peter, brother of the emperor Maurice, the last emperor of the Justinian dynasty.

She also had a son named Ioannes. Fearing infanticide, his father took the boy to Arabia and raised him there. Before his death, when Ioannes was a teenager, the father revealed everything to him about his mother. Later, Ioannes visited his mother, Empress Theodora, in Constantinople, but she had him disappear, and he was never seen again. Some historians, including James Allan Evans, question this account because Theodora publicly acknowledged her illegitimate daughter and, therefore, would have acknowledged an illegitimate son had one existed.

== Empress ==
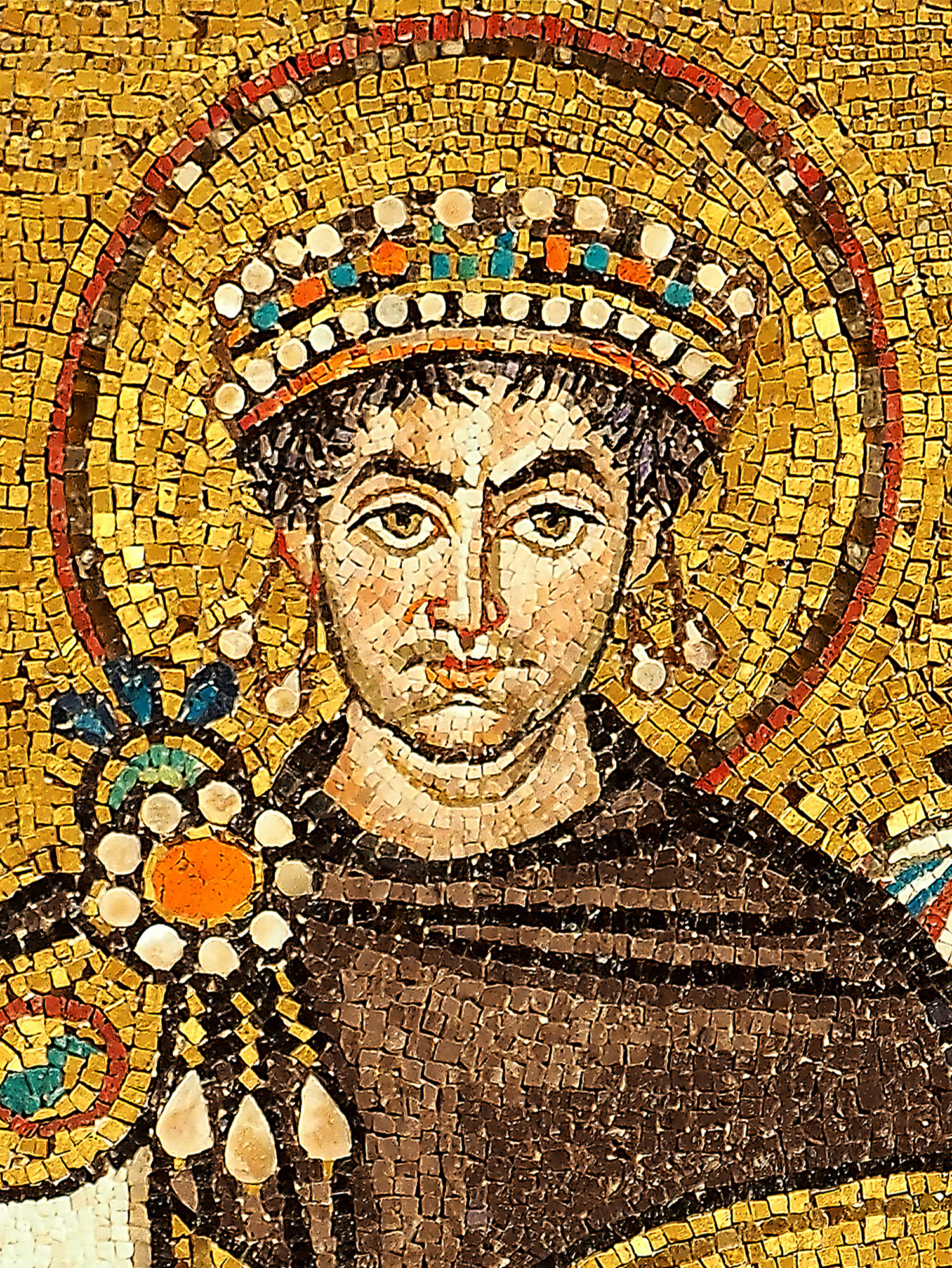
Depiction of Justinian from a contemporary portrait mosaic in the Basilica of San Vitale, Ravenna

When Justinian succeeded to the throne in 527, Theodora was crowned augusta and became empress of the Eastern Roman Empire. According to Procopius' Secret History, she helped her husband make decisions; participated in state councils; and had great influence over him. Justinian sought her advice and called her his "partner in my deliberations" in Novel 8.1 (AD 535), anti-corruption legislation where provincial officials had to take an oath to the emperor and Theodora. Sources generally agree on her character being vindictive but determined and loyal, in marriage and politics. Although most sources agree on her devotion and piousness, her character is also ambiguously described as cruel and inspiring fear.

=== The Nika riots ===
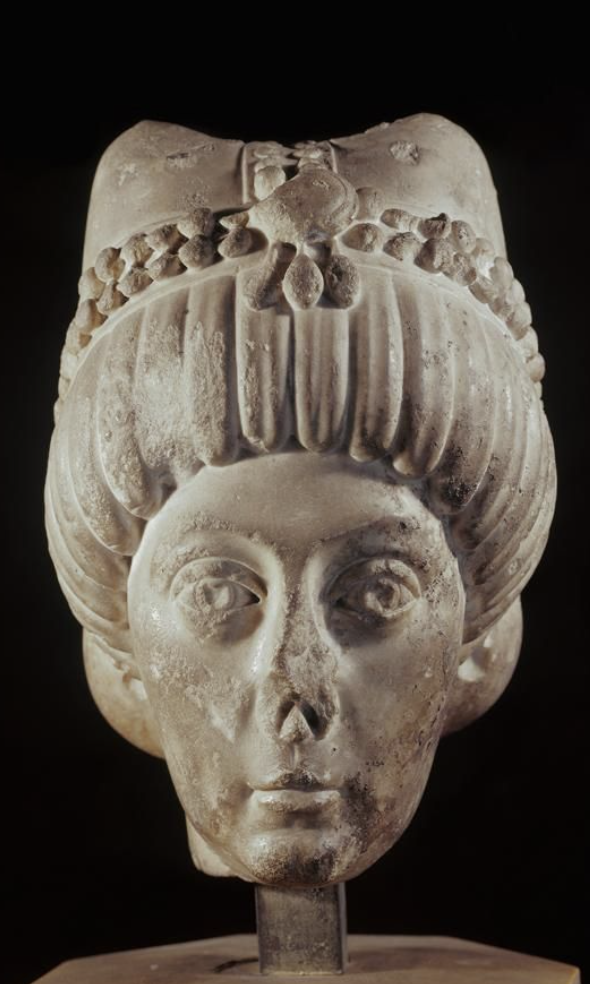
Marble sculpture of an empress, probably Theodora, in the Castello Sforzesco. Mid-sixth century A.D.

The conflicts between the chariot racing factions – the Blues and the Greens – often led to street violence in the 6th century. Both Justinian and Theodora were believed to align with the Blues. Consequently, the Greens felt isolated and frustrated. Following a riot between the two factions in early January 532, a group of both Green and Blue leaders were sentenced to death but two of the felons, one Blue and one Green, survived the hanging. When the emperor remained unresponsive to the circus factions' demands to pardon the two, the angry factions united chanting "Nika", meaning "conquer".

The rioters set many public buildings on fire and proclaimed a new emperor, Hypatius, the nephew of the former emperor Anastasius I. Unable to control the mob, Justinian and his officials prepared to flee. According to Procopius, Theodora spoke out against fleeing during a meeting of the government council, underlining the significance of someone who dies a ruler instead of living as an exile.

According to Procopius, Theodora interrupted the emperor and his counselors, saying:

My lords, the present occasion is too serious to allow me to follow the convention that a woman should not speak in a man's council. Those whose interests are threatened by extreme danger should think only of the wisest course of action, not of conventions. In my opinion, flight is not the right course, even if it should bring us to safety. It is impossible for a person, having been born into this world, not to die; but for one who has reigned, it is intolerable to be a fugitive. May I never be deprived of this purple robe, and may I never see the day when those who meet me do not call me Empress. If you wish to save yourself, my lord, there is no difficulty. We are rich; over there is the sea, and yonder are the ships. Yet reflect for a moment whether, when you have once escaped to a place of security, you would not gladly exchange such safety for death. As for me, I agree with the adage, that "royal purple" is the noblest shroud.

Her speech motivated the men, including Justinian. J.A.S Evans states that Theodora managed to steady Justinian and his court and convince them to fight instead of flee. He ordered his troops to attack the demonstrators in the Hippodrome, resulting in the deaths of over 30,000 civilian rebels. (Note: Other reports claim greater numbers of victims, with the numbers increasing with the distance from Constantinople; Pseudo-Zachariah of Mytilene estimated the dead at more than 80,000.) Despite his claims that he was unwillingly named emperor by the mob, Hypatius and his brother Pompeius were put to death by Justinian. In one source, this came at Theodora's insistence.

Some scholars such as J.A.S Evans state that Theodora's speech had an 'ambiguous' undertone. They believe Procopius intended to portray Justinian as more cowardly than his wife, noting that Procopius made her quote an advice given to the notorious tyrant Dionysius of Syracuse. Changing the term "tyranny" (tyrannis) to "royal purple" or "kingship" (basileia) possibly reflects Procopius' intent to link Theodora and Justinian to ancient tyrants. Evans further argues that Procopius has dramatized the event, presenting a story with two levels of meaning, suggesting that Procopius intended not only to record history but also to offer a deeper commentary on power and morality. Theodora's speech as quoted by Procopius can be viewed as representative of the discussions which took place in the palace rather than literal.

=== Activities ===
Justinian and Theodora commissioned the construction of a number of new buildings in Constantinople, including churches, the most famous of which is Hagia Sophia.

Procopius states that Justinian and Theodora introduced a change in greeting ceremonies. Court officials were now required to kiss both of their feet, whereas previously they kissed only the emperor's robes and not the empress's. Procopius' description of the ceremony was corroborated by the poet Corippus. Justinian and Theodora also required people to call them "master" and "mistress".

Procopius also alleges that she ordered the murder of Ostrogothic Queen Amalasuintha, something that is independently confirmed by a surviving letter from King Theodahad to Theodora. In the letter, Peter the Illyrian is confirmed as her emissary and it refers to “that person about whom a gentle hint had reached us” and promises that “something has been ordered that will suit your desires.”

Theodora was at odds with praetorian prefect John the Cappadocian because of his influence and his slanders of her to the emperor. Theodora and Antonina, the wife of Belisarius, devised a plot to bring down John. The plot took place in 541, when Antonina tricked John's daughter into believing a plot had been devised which would ultimately dispose Justinian as emperor, favouring Belisarius. After informing her father of this alleged plot, Theodora caught John making 'treasonous remarks' and therefore succeeded in removing him. According to Procopius however, Theodora strategically opposed John—a close friend and ally to the emperor—as a result of his growing power and wealth.

She was also hostile to Germanus, the cousin of Justinian. In contrast, the praetorian prefect Peter Barsymes was her ally. She engaged in matchmaking, forming a network of alliances between Emperor Anastasius' family, pre-existing nobility, and Justinian's family. According to Secret History, she attempted to marry her grandson Anastasius to Joannina, Belisarius' and Antonina's daughter and heiress, against her parents' will. Although the marriage was initially rejected, the couple eventually married. The marriages of her sister Comito to general Sittas and her niece Sophia to Justinian's nephew Justin II, who would succeed to the throne, are suspected to have been engineered by Theodora. She also gave reception and sent letters and gifts to Persian and foreign ambassadors and the sister of Kavad.

Theodora was involved in helping underprivileged women. In one instance, she compelled general Artabanes, who intended to wed Justinian's niece, to reclaim the wife he abandoned. She sometimes freed prostitutes. She created a convent on the Asian side of the Dardanelles called the Metanoia (Repentance), where the ex-prostitutes could support themselves. Procopius' Secret History maintained that instead of preventing forced prostitution (as in Buildings 1.9.3ff), Theodora is said to have "rounded up" 500 prostitutes, confining them to a convent. They sought to escape "the unwelcome transformation" by leaping over the walls (SH 17). On the other hand, chronicler John Malalas wrote positively about the convent, declaring that Theodora "freed the girls from the yoke of their wretched slavery." In 528, Theodora and Justinian ordered the closure of the brothels and the arrest of their keepers and procurers. She paid their owners back the purchase fee, freeing the prostitutes from their captivity. To facilitate the start of their new lives, she supplied the liberated women with clothing and gifted each of them a gold nomisma.

In Wars, Procopius mentioned that Theodora was naturally inclined to assist women in misfortune and, according to Secret History, she was accused of unfairly championing the wives charged with adultery (SH 17). The code of Justinian only allowed women to seek a divorce from their husbands due to either abuse or a wife catching their husband in obvious adultery. Regardless, women seeking a divorce had to provide clear evidence of their claims. Procopius describes Theodora as causing women to "become morally depraved" due to her and Justinian's legal actions.

=== Religious policy ===
Saint Theodora
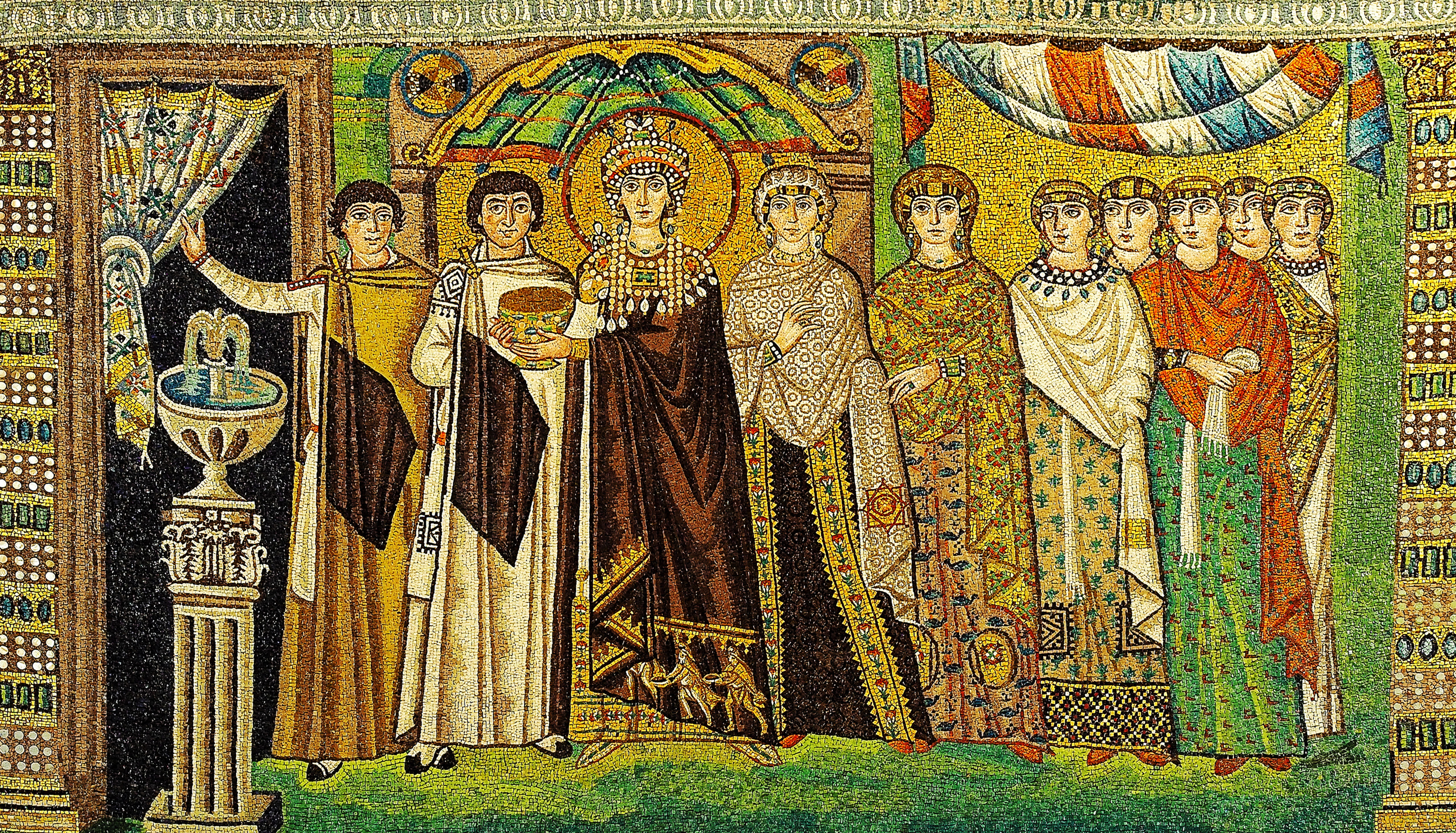
- Empress Theodora and attendants (mosaic from Basilica of San Vitale, 6th century)

Empress
- Venerated in: Eastern Orthodox Church; Oriental Orthodox Church
- Major shrine: Church of the Holy Apostles, Constantinople modern-day Istanbul, Turkey
- Feast: 14 November in the Eastern Orthodox Church, 28 June in the Syriac Orthodox Church
- Attributes: Imperial Vestment

Justinian worked to heal the divide between the supporters of different Christological doctrines by bringing the Monophysites/Miaphysites (anti-Chalcedonians) under the Chalcedonian Church. Theodora, reputed to be a Miaphysite, worked against her husband's support of the Chalcedonian Christianity in the ongoing struggle for the dominance of each faction. As a result, she was accused by pro-Chalcedonians of fostering heresy and undermining the unity of Christendom. However, Procopius and Evagrius Scholasticus suggested that Justinian and Theodora were merely pretending to oppose each other, a view also followed by some modern historians.

John of Ephesus, a key figure within the Miaphysite movement, wrote of the significant contributions of Theodora in assisting church building projects and supporting the poor. Her involvement also was documented as being instrumental to the protection of the Monophysites from the Chalcedonians. Theodora founded a Miaphysite monastery in Sykae and provided shelter in the palace for Miaphysite leaders who faced opposition from the majority of Chalcedonian Christians, like Severus and Anthimus. Anthimus had been appointed Patriarch of Constantinople under her influence and, after the ex-communication order, he was hidden in Theodora's quarters for ten years. When the Chalcedonian Patriarch Ephraim provoked a violent revolt in Antioch, eight Miaphysite bishops were invited to Constantinople; Theodora welcomed them and housed them in the Hormisdas Palace, Justinian and Theodora's dwelling before they became Emperor and Empress. Theodora persistently provided sanctuary for persecuted Miaphysites within the Palace, accommodating such a significant number of monks that, in one incident, several hundred gathered in a grand chamber, causing the floor to collapse. Furthermore, the Empress was involved in building the Church of Sergius and Bacchus, located next to Hormisdas palace. The dedicatory inscription, which remains visible to this day, proclaims: "May he [Sergius] increase the power of the God-crowned Theodora whose mind is adorned with piety, whose constant toil lies in unsparing efforts to nourish the destitute."

When Pope Timothy III of Alexandria died, Theodora enlisted the help of the Augustal Prefect and the Duke of Egypt to make Theodosius, a disciple of Severus, the new pope. Thus, she outmaneuvered her husband who wanted a Chalcedonian successor. However, Pope Theodosius I of Alexandria and the imperial troops could not hold Alexandria against Justinian's Chalcedonian followers; Justinian exiled the pope and 300 Miaphysites to the fortress of Delcus in Thrace.

When Pope Silverius refused Theodora's demand that he remove the anathema of Pope Agapetus I from Patriarch Anthimus, she sent Belisarius instructions to find a pretext to remove Silverius. Silverius was subsequently exiled to a rocky island, where he starved to death. When this was accomplished, Pope Vigilius was appointed in his stead.

In Nobatae, south of Egypt, the inhabitants were converted to Miaphysite Christianity about 540. Justinian was determined that they should be converted to the Chalcedonian faith, with Theodora equally determined that they should become Miaphysites. Justinian made arrangements for Chalcedonian missionaries from Thebaid to go with presents to Silko, the King of the Nobatae. In response, Theodora prepared her missionaries and wrote to the Duke of Thebaid, asking that he should delay her husband's embassy so that the Miaphysite missionaries would arrive first. The duke was canny enough to thwart the easygoing Justinian instead of the unforgiving Theodora. He made sure that the Chalcedonian missionaries were delayed; when they eventually reached Silko, they were sent away. The Nobatae had already adopted the Miaphysite creed of Theodosius.

== Death ==
Theodora's death is recorded by Victor of Tunnuna, with the cause uncertain; however, the Greek terms used are often translated as "cancer". Her death date was 28 June 548. Later accounts attribute the death to breast cancer but this was not identified in the original report, where the use of the term "cancer" probably referred to a more general "suppurating ulcer or malignant tumor". She was buried in the Church of the Holy Apostles in Constantinople. During a procession in 559, 11 years after her death, Justinian visited her tomb and lit candles in her memory.

== Historiography ==
The main historical sources about her life are the works of her contemporary Procopius, who was a legal advisor to general Belisarius. Procopius wrote three major history works. The first, The Wars of Justinian (commonly known as History of the Wars), was largely completed by 550.. In this he paints a picture of Theodora as a courageous woman who helped save Justinian's attempt at the throne.

The second work was the Secret History which he wrote only after the death of Theodora, as she could be very vindictive and by keeping notes he was putting his own life in danger.The books was largely unknown until it was found and published in Vatican in 1623. The work has sometimes been interpreted as representing disillusionment with Emperor Justinian, the empress, and his patron, Belisarius. Justinian is depicted as cruel, corrupt, extravagant, and incompetent; while Theodora is shrewish and openly sexual.

His third work, Buildings of Justinian, which was written around 554, after Secret History, is a panegyric that paints Justinian and Theodora as a pious couple. It presents particularly flattering portrayals of them; her piety and beauty are praised. Theodora was dead when the work was published, and Justinian most likely commissioned the work.

Her contemporary John of Ephesus writes about Theodora in Lives of the Eastern Saints and mentions an illegitimate daughter. Theophanes the Confessor mentions some familial relations of Theodora that were not mentioned by Procopius. Victor of Tunnuna notes her familial relation to the next empress, Sophia. Bar-Hebraeus and Michael the Syrian both say Theodora was from the city of Daman, near Kallinikos, Syria. These later Miaphysite sources account say that Theodora is the daughter of a priest, trained in the pious practices of Miaphysitism since birth. The Miaphysites tend to regard Theodora as one of their own. Their account is also an alternative to that of contemporary John of Ephesus. Many modern scholars prefer Procopius' account.

=== Critiques of Procopius ===
Some modern historians argue that Procopius is not necessarily a reliable source for understanding Theodora. According to James Allan Evans, his aggressive portrayal of the empress reflects how the higher class circles felt threatened by her power, rather than her true reputation. For him, it is necessary to question that bias since Procopius' description is "the opposite of the reputation she cultivated". David Potter writes that some stories reflect the values that a good empress is pious and chaste while a bad empress is promiscuous and greedy. According to Averil Cameron, the portrayal of Justinian and Theodora as demons in the Secret History may reflect a common contemporary way to rationalize the inexplicable. Peter Heather observes that Theodora's "supposed sexual voracity is immortalised in the gossipy scholar Procopius' Secret History: arguably the most effective piece of character assassination ever written".

Other modern historians believe that Procopius' narrative about Theodora is more reliable than often thought. Anthony Kaldellis and Clive Foss point out that a number of independent sources corroborate Procopius' claims, such as her background in theatre, the marriage legislation and her ruthlessness against her enemies. Contemporary texts other than Procopius' Secret History also confirm her involvement in the downfall of Silverius, Bishop of Rome and Priscus, the imperial secretary and Commander of the Excubitors. According to Foss, Procopius may have embellished, rather than invented, the story.

== Legacy ==
According to one historian, "No empress left so profound a mark on the imagination of her people as did Theodora." The Miaphysites believed Theodora's influence on Justinian was so strong that, after her death, he worked to bring harmony between the Miaphysites (Non-Chalcedonian) and the Chalcedonian Christians and kept his promise to protect her little community of Miaphysite refugees in the Hormisdas Palace. Theodora provided much political support for the ministry of Jacob Baradaeus.

Olbia in Cyrenaica was renamed Theodorias after Theodora. (It was common for ancient cities to rename themselves to honor an Emperor or Empress.) Now called Qasr Libya, the city is known for its sixth-century mosaics. The settlement of Cululis (modern-day Ain Jelloula) in what is now Tunisia (Africa Proconsularis) was also renamed Theodoriana after Theodora.

Theodora and Justinian are represented in mosaics in the Basilica of San Vitale of Ravenna, Italy, which were completed in 547, a year before her death, when the Byzantines retook the city. She is depicted in full imperial garb, endowed with jewels befitting her role as empress. Her cloak is embroidered with imagery of the three kings bearing their gifts for the Christ child, symbolizing a connection between her and Justinian bringing gifts to the church. In this case, she is shown bearing a communion chalice. Another mosaic depicted Theodora and Justinian receiving the vanquished kings of the Goths and Vandals as prisoners of war, surrounded by the cheering Roman Senate. The Emperor and Empress are recognized for both victory and in generosity in these large-scale public works. In more recent times, plays, operas, films, and novels have been written about Theodora.

== Media portrayal ==
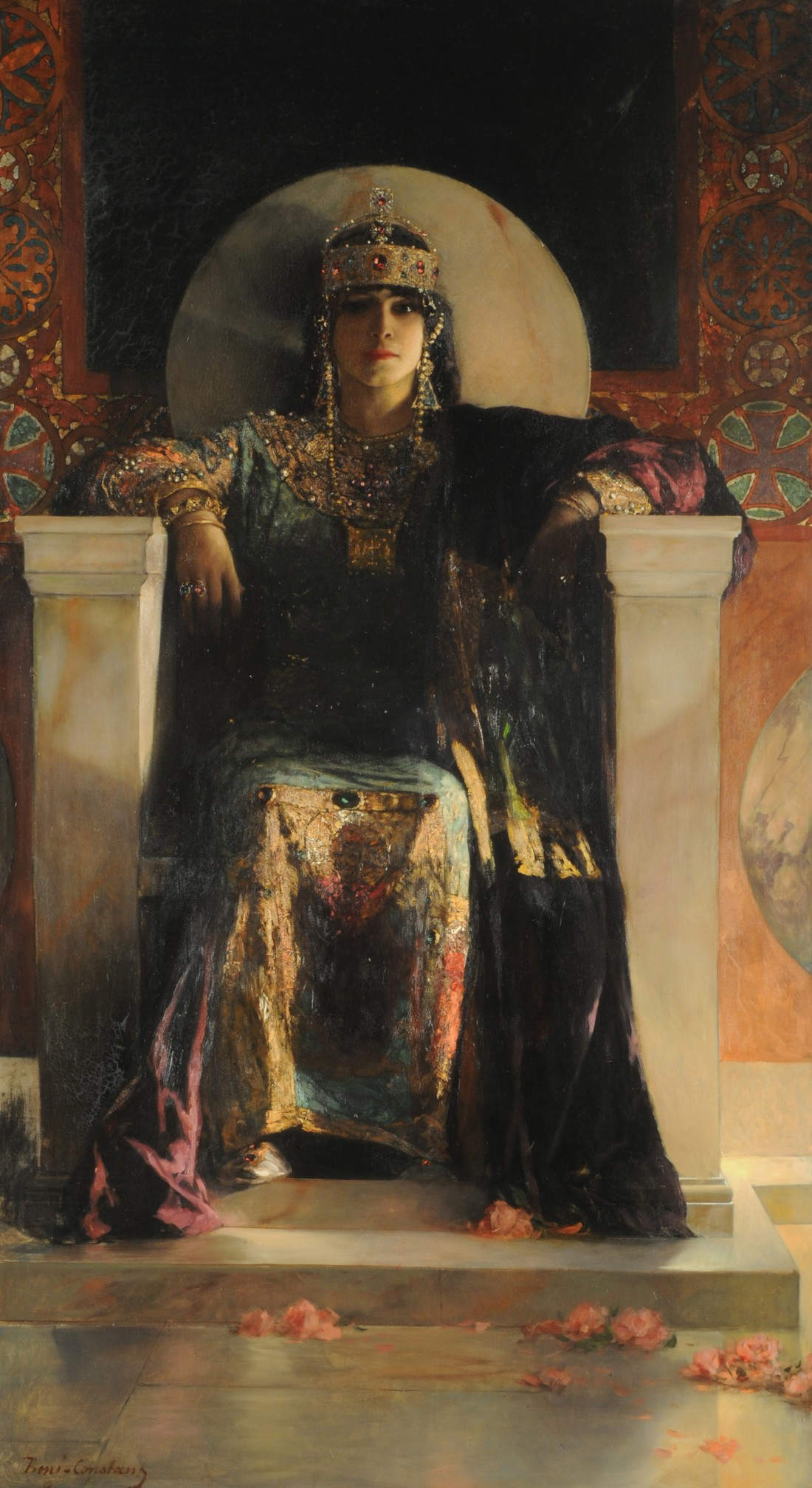
Théodora (1887), by Jean-Joseph Benjamin-Constant, Museo Nacional de Bellas Artes

=== Art ===
- The 1932–1934 artwork Famous Women Dinner Service and the 1979 artwork The Dinner Party both feature a plate or place setting for Theodora.

=== Books ===
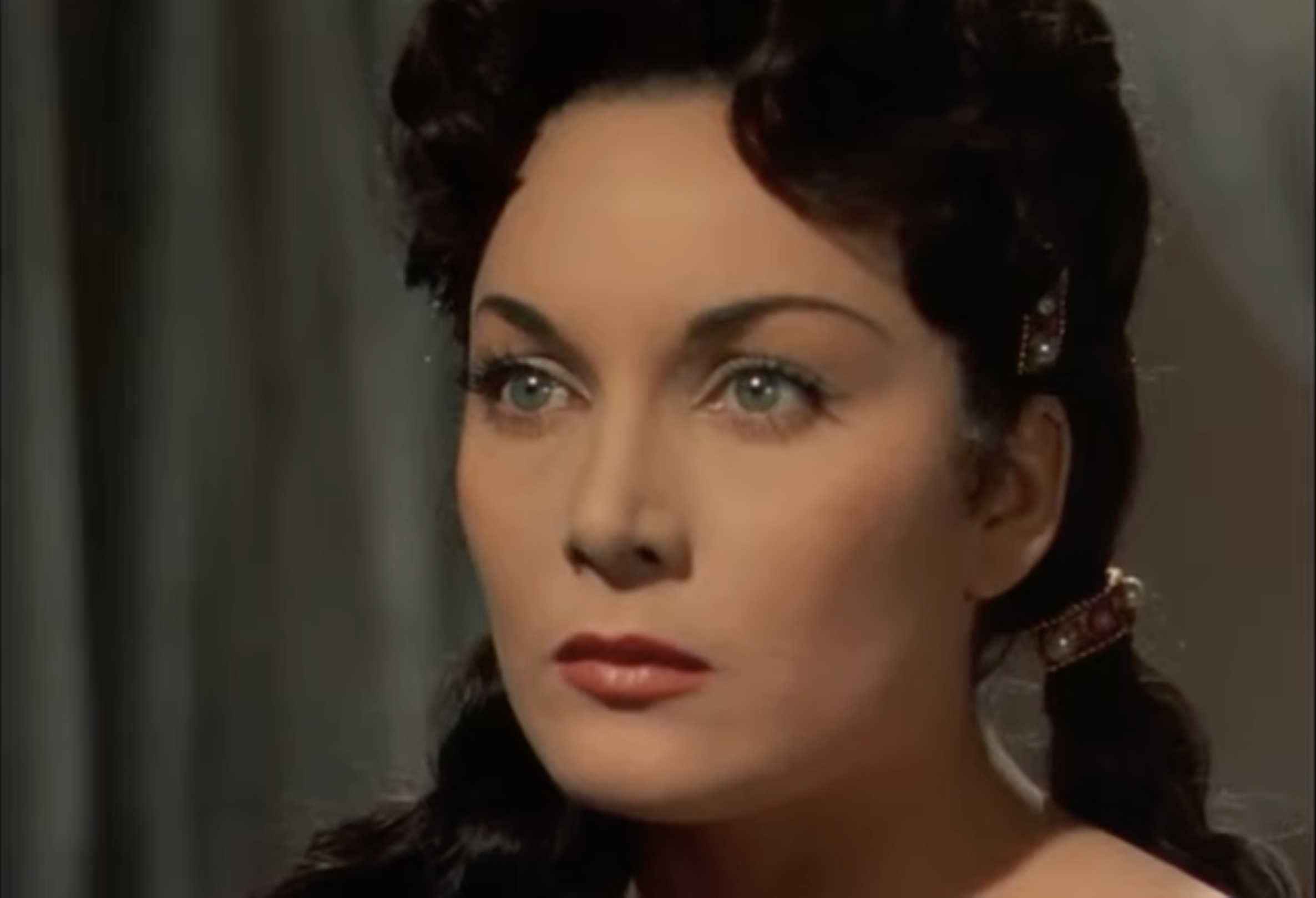
Gianna Maria Canale as Theodora (1954)

- The Sarantine Mosaic (1998) is a historical fantasy by Guy Gavriel Kay that is modeled on the Byzantium empire and the story of Justinian and Theodora.
- In the historical mystery novel One for Sorrow by Mary Reed/Eric Mayer, Theodora is one of the suspects in the murder case investigated by John, the Lord Chamberlain.
- Theodora is the protagonist of the historical fiction novel, Secret History, by Stephanie Thorton.
- Stella Duffy's 2010 historical novel, Theodora: Actress, Empress, Whore, tells the story of Theodora's life, from childhood to reigning queen.

=== Film ===
- Teodora (1921) aka Theodora. Directed by Leopoldo Carlucci. Rita Jolivet performs the role of Theodora.
- Teodora, Imperatrice di Bisanzio (1954) aka Theodora, Slave Empress. Directed by Riccardo Freda. Gianna Maria Canale performs the role of Theodora.
- The Last Roman (1968/69). Directed by Robert Siodmak. Sylva Koscina performs the role of Theodora.
- Primary Russia (1985). Directed by Gennady Vasilyev. Margarita Terekhova performs the role of Theodora.

== Sources ==
- Bryce, James (1911). "Theodora" . In Chisholm, Hugh (ed.). Encyclopædia Britannica. Vol. 26 (11th ed.). Cambridge University Press. pp. 761–762.
- Cameron, Averil (1976). Corippus: In laudem lustini Augusti minoris. Translated by Cameron, Averil. London: Bloomsbury. ISBN 978-04-85-11157-6.
- Cameron, Averil (1985). Procopius and the sixth century (2nd ed.). London: Routledge. ISBN 0-415-14294-6. OCLC 36048226.
- Evans, James (2002). The Empress Theodora. Partner of Justinian. Austin, Texas: University of Texas Press.
- Evans, James (2011). The Power Game in Byzantium. Antonina and the Empress Theodora. London: Continuum.
- Foss, C (2002). "The Empress Theodora". Byzantion. 72 (1): 141–176.
- Garland, Lynda (1999). Byzantine empresses: women and power in Byzantium, AD 527-1204. London: Routledge.
- Heather, Peter (2022). Christendom: The Triumph of a Religion. London, UK: Penguin Books. ISBN 978-0-141-98853-5.
- Kaldellis, Anthony (2010). Prokopios: The Secret History: With Related Texts. Translated by Kaldellis, Anthony. Indianapolis/Cambridge: Hackett Publishing Company, Inc. ISBN 978-1603841801.
- Kaldellis, Anthony (2023). The New Roman Empire: A History of Byzantium. New York: Oxford University Press. ISBN 978-0197549322.
- Kaldellis, Anthony (2004). Procopius of Caesarea: Tyranny, History, and Philosophy at the End of Antiquity. University of Pennsylvania. ISBN 978-0-8122-0241-0. OCLC 956784628.
- Martindale, J. R. Z (1992). The Prosopography of the Later Roman Empire. Vol. 3. Cambridge University Press.
- Potter, David (2015). Theodora. Actress, Empress, Saint. Oxford, UK: Oxford University Press. ISBN 978-0-19-974076-5.
- Karagianni, Alexandra (2013). "Female Monarchs in the Medieval Byzantine Court: Prejudice, Disbelief, and Calumnies". In Woodacre, Elena (ed.). Queenship in the Mediterranean: Negotiating the Role of the Queen in the Medieval and Early Modern Eras. New York: Palgrave Macmillan. p. 22. ISBN 978-1-137-36282-7.

Royal titles
| Preceded by Euphemia | Roman Empress; 527–548 | Succeeded by Sophia |
