= Rocky Mountain Mystery =

1935 film by Charles Barton

- Theatrical release poster
- Directed by: Charles Barton
- Screenplay by: Edward E. Paramore Jr.; Ethel Doherty
- Based on: Golden Dreams by Zane Grey
- Produced by: Harold Hurley
- Starring: Randolph Scott; Mrs. Leslie Carter; Ann Sheridan
- Cinematography: Archie Stout
- Edited by: Jack Dennis
- Music by: Rudolph G. Kopp
- Production company: Paramount Pictures
- Distributed by: Paramount Pictures
- Release date: March 1, 1935 (USA)
- Running time: 63 minutes
- Country: United States
- Language: English

Rocky Mountain Mystery is a 1935 American Western film directed by Charles Barton and starring Randolph Scott, Mrs. Leslie Carter, and Ann Sheridan. Based on an unpublished novel Golden Dreams by Zane Grey, the film is about a mining engineer who teams up with a crusty deputy sheriff to solve a series of mystery killings at an old radium mine where the owner's family waits for his death for their inheritance. The film was re-released under the title The Fighting Westerner.

== Plot ==
Mining engineer Larry Sutton arrives at the Ballard radium mine to take over as chief engineer from his missing brother-in-law Jack Parson, who is a suspect in the murder of ranch caretaker Adolph Borg. Sutton teams up with deputy sheriff Tex Murdock who is investigating the murder. Staying at the ranch with the ailing owner, Jim Ballard, are his niece Flora and nephew Fritz who have been notified of their uncle's failing health, and now wait to inherit his legacy. Also staying at the ranch is a mysterious Chinese servant named Ling Yat, the housekeeper Mrs. Borg, her son John, and the beautiful and spirited Rita Ballard, another niece, who quickly earns Sutton's trust and romantic interest.

Shortly after Sutton arrives, Fritz is murdered by a mysterious cloaked figure in the same manner that Adolph was killed—crushed beneath the massive weight of a stamp mill, a huge apparatus used to pulverize rock to unearth valuable ore. Sutton and Tex find that the ranch guests all have alibis. Soon the mysterious cloaked figure strikes again, shooting young John, attacking Sutton, and slashing Flora's throat. While the investigation continues, Jim takes a turn for the worse, prompting Sutton to contact Jim's ex-wife, who hasn't been to the ranch in thirty years.

When Mrs. Ballard arrives at the ranch, Mrs. Borg tries to prevent her from seeing her ailing ex-husband. Sutton helps her upstairs where they discover that "Jim" is actually Adolph Borg. He and his wife had killed the real Jim Ballard sometime earlier during a takeover attempt by the Borg family. Adolph tricks Sutton and escapes, taking Rita as a hostage. Sutton follows them to the mine where he fights with Adolph and John. Adolph falls to his death and Sutton rescues Rita. Mrs. Borg, John, and Ling Yat are sentenced to twenty years in prison, and Tex is made sheriff. Larry and Rita get married and buy a ranch in Hawaii.

== Cast ==
- Randolph Scott as Larry Sutton
- Mrs. Leslie Carter as Mrs. Borg
- Ann Sheridan as Rita Ballard
- Chic Sale as Tex Murdock
- Kathleen Burke as Flora Ballard
- George F. Marion as Jim Ballard
- Florence Roberts as Mrs. Ballard
- Howard Wilson as Fritz Ballard
- Willie Fung as Ling Yat
- James Eagles as John Borg

== Production ==
Rocky Mountain Mystery was filmed on location at the Doble mine and at the stamping mill on Gold Mountain at Big Bear Lake, Big Bear Valley, California. The film's sets were designed by the art director David S. Garber. Based on an unpublished novel Golden Dreams by Zane Grey, the film's original working title was The Vanishing Pioneer. The film was later re-released under the title The Fighting Westerner.

== Reception ==
In his review for DVD Talk, Carl Davis noted the film's uniqueness in its "modern bent for being a western". Set shortly after World War I, the story incorporates automobiles, telephones, and even a modern radium mine that "set the film apart and add depth to this typical, by-the-numbers mystery". Davis concludes, "The Fighting Westerner really is a mystery, and a 'fair play' one at that. Enough clues are given so that if the audience pays attention, they can figure out the answer well before the final reel".
