= Girls Do Not Joke =

1929 film

- Directed by: Alfred Lind
- Starring: Leda Gloria; Maurizio D'Ancora; Giuseppe Pierozzi
- Cinematography: Alfredo Donelli
- Production company: S.A.C.I.A.
- Distributed by: S.A.C.I.A.
- Release date: December 1929
- Country: Italy
- Languages: Silent; Italian intertitles

Girls Do Not Joke (Italian: Ragazze non scherzate) is a 1929 Italian silent comedy film directed by Alfred Lind and starring Leda Gloria, Maurizio D'Ancora and Giuseppe Pierozzi.

== Cast ==
- Isa Bluette
- Maurizio D'Ancora
- Leda Gloria
- Piero Pastore
- Giuseppe Pierozzi

== Bibliography ==
- Riccardo Redi. Cinema muto italiano: 1896-1930. Fondazione Scuola nazionale di cinema, 1999.
