= Lady with Red Hair =

1940 film by Curtis Bernhardt

- Directed by: Kurt Bernhardt
- Written by: Mrs. Leslie Carter (memoirs); Brewster Morse (story); Norbert Faulkner (story); Charles Kenyon (screenplay); Milton Krims (screenplay)
- Produced by: Edmund Grainger; Bryan Foy; Jack L. Warner
- Starring: Miriam Hopkins; Claude Rains; Richard Ainley; Laura Hope Crews
- Cinematography: Arthur Edeson
- Edited by: James Gibbon
- Music by: Heinz Roemheld
- Production company: Warner Bros. Pictures
- Distributed by: Warner Bros. Pictures
- Release date: November 30, 1940
- Running time: 78 minutes
- Country: United States
- Language: English

Lady with Red Hair is a 1940 American historical drama film directed by Curtis Bernhardt and starring Miriam Hopkins, Claude Rains and Richard Ainley. Released by Warner Bros. Pictures it stars Hopkins as the nineteenth century actress Mrs. Leslie Carter. Future star Alexis Smith made her screen debut in a small role.

The film's sets were designed by the art director Max Parker.

== Plot ==
When Caroline Carter is divorced by her wealthy husband, she also loses custody of her son Dudley in the proceedings. Down on the ground she decides to win her fortune and son back. She leaves Chicago for New York to become an actress and tries to get acquainted to the theatrical producer David Belasco.

Belasco just wants to get rid of Caroline and promises to write her a play to get her out of his office. He has no intention of giving her work, but when she ultimately confronts him on the matter several months afterwards, he tries to get her a part in a show.

He succeeds, but the show is a failure, and instead Caroline decides to marry an actor living at the same boardinghouse, Lou Payne. Belasco tries to stop her from domesticating too soon, and take a part in another show instead. This show is a success on Broadway and Caroline eventually gets an opportunity to return to Chicago to perform. However, her triumph is stained by the fact that she has grown apart from her son.

Caroline goes on to perform in both America and Europe and in lack of a family she is consumed by her career. After some time she decides to go back to Payne and marry him. Belasco gets jealous and punishes her by not letting her work with him anymore.

Caroline pursues a career on her own, but her ambitions are thwarted by a series of unsuccessful shows. Payne eventually convinces Belasco to start working with Caroline again, and the duo reconciles.

== Cast ==
- Miriam Hopkins as Mrs. Leslie Carter
- Claude Rains as David Belasco
- Richard Ainley as Lou Payne
- Laura Hope Crews as Mrs. Dudley
- Helen Westley as Mrs. Frazier
- John Litel as Charles Bryant
- Mona Barrie as Mrs. Hilda Brooks
- Victor Jory as Mr. Clifton
- Cecil Kellaway as Mr. Chapman
- Fritz Leiber as Mr. Foster
- Johnnie Russell as Dudley Carter
- Selmer Jackson as Henry DeMille

Uncredited

- Alexis Smith as Girl at Wedding
- Cornel Wilde as Mr. Williams
- Maris Wrixon as Miss Annie Ellis
- Doris Lloyd as Teacher at Miss Humbert's School
- Lillian Kemble-Cooper as London Party Guest
- Halliwell Hobbes as Divorce Judge
- Creighton Hale as Reporter Eddie

== Bibliography ==
- Daniel Bubbeo. The Women of Warner Brothers: The Lives and Careers of 15 Leading Ladies, with Filmographies for Each. McFarland, 2001.
