= Madeleine Céliat =

French actress

- Occupation: Actress
- Years active: 1910-1916 (film )

Madeleine Céliat was a French stage and film actress of the silent era. She appeared in nearly thirty French and Italian films during the 1910s.

Madeleine Céliat is the Pseudonym of Marie-Madelaine Coquelle, she married the writer Max Fischer, on May 10, 1926, in Paris.

== Selected filmography ==
- Messaline (1910)
- Monna Vanna (1915)

== Bibliography ==
- Claude Aziza. Le péplum: l'Antiquité au cinéma. Corlet, 1998.
