= Good Women =

1921 film

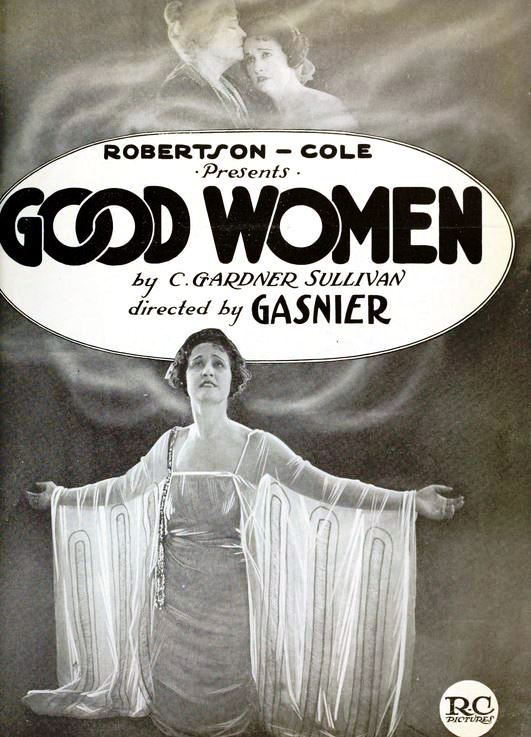
- Directed by: Louis J. Gasnier
- Written by: C. Gardner Sullivan
- Starring: Rosemary Theby; Hamilton Revelle; Earl Schenck
- Cinematography: Arthur Edeson
- Production company: Robertson-Cole Pictures Corporation
- Distributed by: Robertson-Cole Pictures Corporation
- Release date: April 3, 1921
- Running time: 60 minutes
- Country: United States
- Languages: Silent; English intertitles

Good Women is a 1921 American silent drama film directed by Louis J. Gasnier and starring Rosemary Theby, Hamilton Revelle and Earl Schenck.

== Cast ==
- Rosemary Theby as Katherine Brinkley
- Hamilton Revelle as Nicolai Brouevitch
- Irene Blackwell as Inna Brouevitch
- Earl Schenck as John Wilmot
- William P. Carleton as Sir Richard Egglethorpe
- Arthur Stuart Hull as Franklin Shelby
- Rhea Mitchell as Natalie Shelby
- Eugenie Besserer as Mrs. Emmeline Shelby

== Bibliography ==
- Connelly, Robert B. The Silents: Silent Feature Films, 1910-36, Volume 40, Issue 2. December Press, 1998.
- Munden, Kenneth White. The American Film Institute Catalog of Motion Pictures Produced in the United States, Part 1. University of California Press, 1997.
