= John the Cappadocian =

6th-century Byzantine official and law codifier

John the Cappadocian (Greek: Ἰωάννης ὁ Καππαδόκης) (fl. 530s, living 548) was a praetorian prefect of the East (532–541) in the Byzantine Empire under Emperor Justinian I (r. 527–565). He was also a patrician and the consul ordinarius of 538.

John the Cappadocian was the administrative and financial mastermind behind Emperor Justinian I, serving as the praetorian prefect of the East and the Logothetes from 532 to 541. Renowned for his formidable intellect and unmatched efficiency, he fundamentally restructured the Byzantine bureaucracy and implemented ruthless tax collection policies. His aggressive fiscal reforms stabilized the treasury, directly funding Justinian's ambitious imperial reconquests, monumental building projects like the Hagia Sophia, and the drafting of the landmark legal code, the Corpus Juris Civilis.

However, his brutal extraction of wealth made him deeply despised by both the peasantry and the senatorial aristocracy, rendering him a primary target during the violent Nika Riots of 532. Though temporarily dismissed to appease the populace, his indispensability to Justinian secured his swift reinstatement and unprecedented political power. This immense influence, combined with his open rivalry and clashing political ambitions, ultimately positioned him as a threat to Empress Theodora. In 541, Theodora orchestrated a covert sting operation that lured him into a treasonous conspiracy, leading to his immediate downfall, the forfeiture of his vast riches, and his forced ordination into the priesthood and exile.

== Biography ==
Both John the Lydian and Zacharias Rhetor report that John was a native of Caesarea, Cappadocia. Procopius, John Malalas, the Chronicon Paschale, and Zacharias called him "John the Cappadocian" for disambiguation reasons, as the name John ("Ioannes" in Greek and "Johannes" in Latin) was widely used by his time. John the Lydian and John Malalas at times mention him only as "the Cappadocian". John occasionally styled himself as "Flavius Marianus Michaelius Gabrielius Archangelus Ioannes", although most of these names were probably just honorifics, as by that time most individuals were known by a single name. His family connections are obscure and only two relatives are known with certainty. Those are his only daughter Euphemia and a kinsman called Ioannes Maxilloplumacius.

=== Rise to power ===
His contemporary historians were biased against him, particularly Procopius and John the Lydian, and their accounts are often coloured by their prejudices. Procopius calls John poorly educated, though he grudgingly admits the Cappadocian's great natural abilities led to his rise to prominence. He first appears in the sources as a scriniarius (notary) in the service of an unidentified magister militum. His administrative ideas reportedly attracted the attention of Emperor Justinian, resulting in his promotion to positions with financial responsibilities. From there, he gained enough favour to become a vir illustris and eventually the acting Prefect. There is a theory that his close relationship with Emperor Justinian may date to Justinian's service as magister militum praesentalis in the 520s, prior to his elevation to the Byzantine throne.

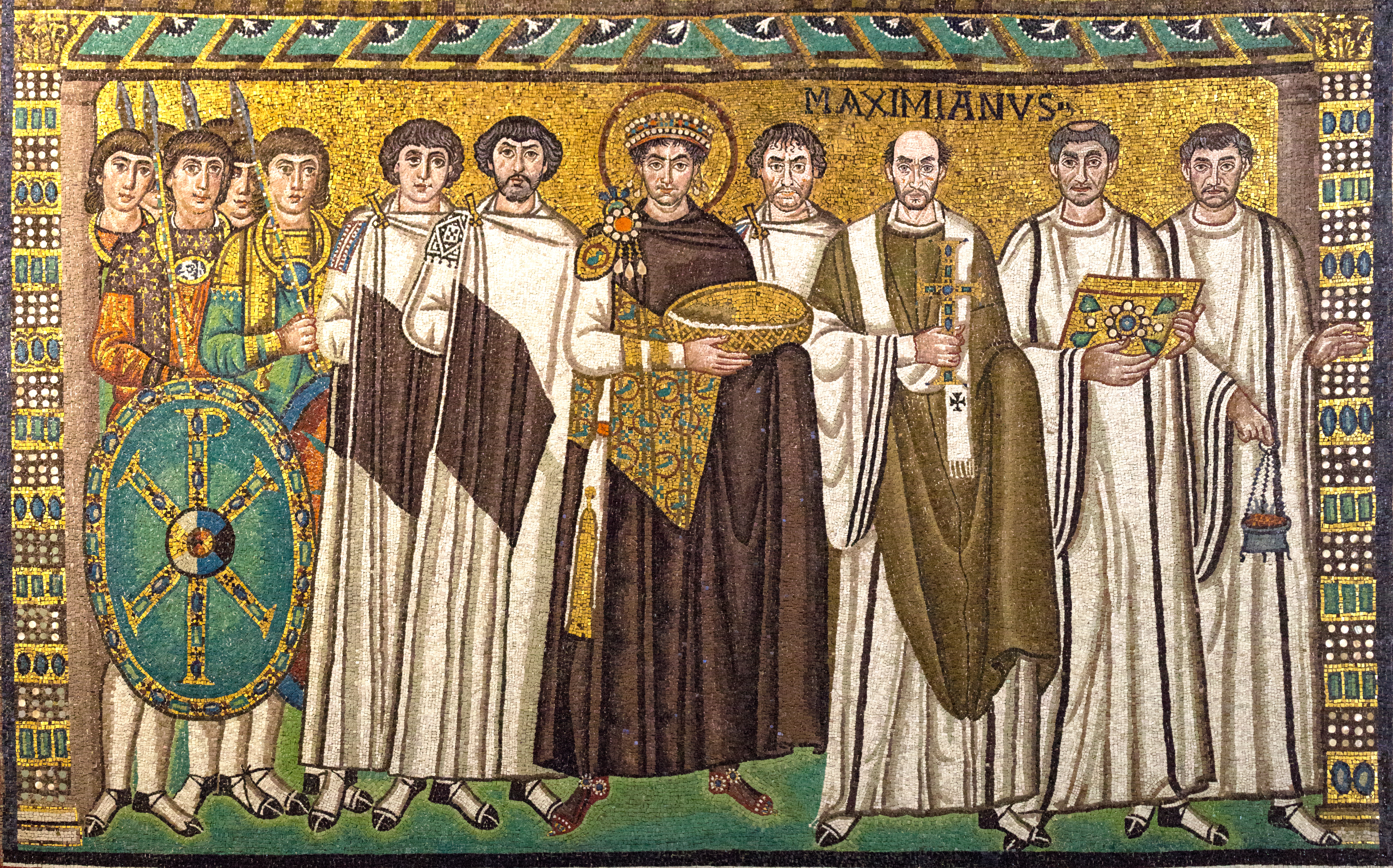
Emperor Justinian I (r. 527–565) and his entourage, mosaic from the Basilica of San Vitale in Ravenna.

John was appointed to lead the first commission on Emperor Justinian's new legal code, the Corpus Juris Civilis, and became Justinian's chief legal advisor. He was also appointed praetorian prefect of the East, giving him the power to introduce new taxes on the population. The new taxes were very unpopular, and the mob involved in the Nika riots of 532 demanded that both John the Cappadocian and the quaestor sacri palatii Tribonian be dismissed. Emperor Justinian did so, until the riots had been suppressed, after which he reinstated John as prefect and Tribonian as quaestor. After the riots, which had been supported by upper-class Senators, John, who had the same lower-class background as Justinian, became even more important in political affairs. John influenced Emperor Justinian's military decisions, helping to draft the Perpetual Peace with Khosrow I (531–579) and convincing Justinian not to empty the treasury with a large expedition against the Vandal kingdom in North Africa. John worked with the Byzantine emperor to reduce the size of the bureaucracy, both in Constantinople and in the provinces, developing a rudimentary meritocracy.

Zacharias reports that the Cappadocian was widely feared for his influence on Emperor Justinian and a tendency to bring accusations against many people. He was reportedly aided by several flatterers in his service. John the Lydian reports that the Cappadocian constructed a prison within the Praetorium of Constantinople. There, prisoners were regularly tortured and executed. John the Lydian asserts that the Cappadocian extracted money from his victims and gives an eyewitness testimony to the execution of one such victim.

John the Lydian goes on to report other changes to life in the Praetorium. The Cappadocian transferred his quarters upstairs, offering the traditional living quarters of the Prefect to his followers. The Prefect reportedly treated his official staff as common slaves. He converted the baths of the Praetorium to a stable for his horses, building a new elevated bathroom for himself equipped with fountains. He reportedly used his official residence to give lavish feasts and indulge "in all manners of debaucheries" while maintaining a luxurious private residence at the same time. Procopius seems to agree, reporting that the Cappadocian would spend his mornings robbing the taxpayers, devoting the rest of the day to "unrestrained debauchery". Procopius also claims that John employed thousands of bodyguards to ensure his security.

=== Downfall and exile ===
John the Cappadocian's downfall seems to have been the result of an ongoing rivalry with Empress Theodora and general Belisarius. He was considered a rival of Theodora for independent and unique influence over Emperor Justinian. At that time the influence of both on the emperor was in fact so great that they became very hostile to each other and each supposedly accused the other to him, so that they could influence the government alone. Belisarius had reportedly gained much popular support following his return from the Gothic War and the Cappadocian considered him another rival favorite. According to Procopius, Theodora and Antonina, wife of Belisarius, allied against the Prefect. Antonina arranged a private meeting with John, supposedly to conspire against Justinian. John agreed to meet her at the palace of Rufinianae near Chalcedon, reportedly violating a direct order by Justinian to avoid secret meetings with Antonina. Their supposedly private conversation was actually overheard by Marcellus and Narses, as pre-arranged by the two women. Marcellus and Narses were ordered by Theodora to kill John if he spoke out in favor of treason. In the ensuing scuffle, however, John escaped and fled to a church, while Marcellus was wounded by one of John's guards. John was removed from office immediately after and banished to Cyzicus.

Theodotus succeeded John as praetorian prefect in late May or early June 541. A continuation of Marcellinus Comes reports that the private residence of John at Constantinople passed to the ownership of Belisarius. The Cappadocian was ordained a priest against his will, but he reportedly avoided practicing his priesthood in fear that this would ruin his chances for a return to power. His wealth was confiscated, but Justinian was reluctant to be overly harsh to his old favourite and restored part of John's private property to him at a later date. Procopius noted that John remained wealthy enough to live a life of luxury, but his troubles were not over. He was hostile to his new superior, Eusebius, Bishop of Cyzicus, and when Eusebius was murdered, the Cappadocian found himself accused of complicity in the crime.

John was imprisoned, his captors beating him to produce a confession. His guilt was not established, but his wealth was again confiscated. This time Justinian was much harsher to him. His new place of exile was Antinoe in Egypt. He was transported there by ship, forced to only wear a cheap cloak and earn his living as a beggar at every stop on the way. Procopius wrote his account on the third year of John's exile, that is in 544. John still did not lose his hopes for restoration to power. He had taken to accusing various citizens of Alexandria of tax avoidance. Procopius notes Theodora's continued efforts to put John on trial for murder, but the residents of Cyzicus would not testify against him.

In 548, Theodora died, and Justinian recalled John to Constantinople. However, the Cappadocian never returned to political power and was not allowed to resign his unwanted priesthood. John Malalas notes that the Cappadocian died peacefully at Constantinople some time later. His contemporary historians acknowledge his ability to identify problems and produce solutions, but decry his wickedness, greed, and the way he squandered his wealth.

=== Cultural depiction ===
John is the main antagonist of Theodora, Slave Empress, a 1954 sword and sandal film depicting Justinian's early reign. The character is played by Henri Guisol.

John was also an antagonist in Stephanie Thorton's 2013 novel about Empress Theodora, Secret History.

== Sources ==
- Bury, John Bagnell (1923) [1889]. History of the Later Roman Empire: From Arcadius to Irene (395 A.D. to 800 A.D.). Vol. II. New York, New York and London, United Kingdom: Macmillan & Company Limited.
- Martindale, John R., ed. (1992). The Prosopography of the Later Roman Empire: Volume III, AD 527–641. Cambridge: Cambridge University Press. ISBN 0-521-20160-8.

Political offices
Vacant Title last held by Belisarius in 535	Consul of the Roman Empire; 538	Succeeded by Strategius Apion
