= DuBarry (film) =

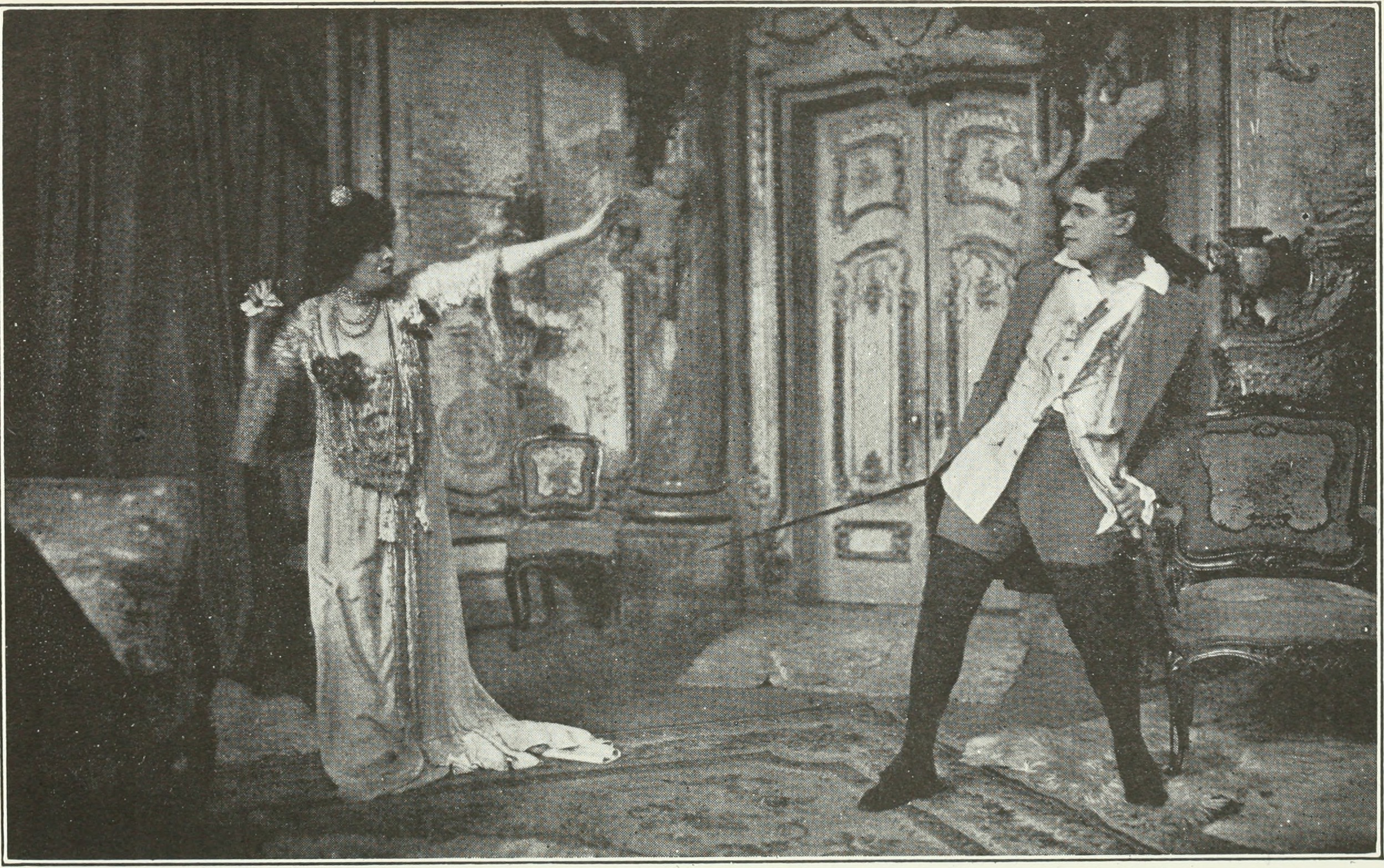
- Mrs. Leslie Carter and Hamilton Revelle in a scene from the 1901 Broadway production of Du Barry
- Directed by: Edoardo Bencivenga
- Written by: David Belasco(play); Arrigo Frusta(scenario)
- Produced by: George Kleine
- Starring: Mrs. Leslie Carter
- Distributed by: Kleine-Edison Feature Services
- Release date: January 18, 1915
- Running time: 6 reels
- Countries: United States; Italy
- Languages: Silent..(English & Italian)

DuBarry is a lost 1915 silent film historical drama based on David Belasco's 1901 play Du Barry. The play itself is adapted from the novel Memoirs d'un médicin by Alexandre Dumas. Mrs. Leslie Carter reprises her role from the Broadway play.

== Cast ==
- Mrs. Leslie Carter - Jeanette Vaubennier/Madame du Barry
- Richard Thornton - Louis XV
- Hamilton Revelle - De Cosse Brissac
- Campbell Gullan - Comte. Jean Du Barry
- Louis Payne - Papa Nuncio
- Armand Pouget - Denys, Madame Dubarry's Servant
- Miss Rawlinson - Hortense - The Head Milliner
- Miss Corah Adams - Marquise De Creney
- Miss Robinson - Marie Antoinette
- Miss Wilkins - Sophia, A Maid)
- Mr. Barker - Duc de Richelieu
- Mrs. Cherney - Maupeau
- Mrs. Eden - Madame La Gourdan

== See also ==
- Du Barry, Woman of Passion (1930)
