= Von Bergen =

von Bergen is a surname. Notable people with the surname include:

- Diego von Bergen (1872–1944), German ambassador
- Drew Von Bergen (1940–2017), American journalist
- John von Bergen (born 1971), American artist
- Karl August von Bergen (1704–1759), German anatomist and botanist
- Maria von Bergen (1840–1927), Swedish school director
- Nora von Bergen (born 1990), Swiss ice dancer
- Pennie Von Bergen Wessels (born 1949), American Democratic politician
- Steve von Bergen (born 1983), Swiss footballer

== See also ==
Van Bergen (disambiguation)
