= Mrs. Leslie Carter =

American silent film and stage actress (1857–1937)

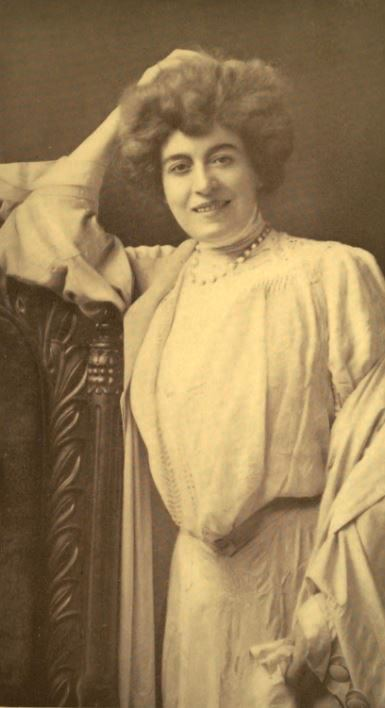
- Mrs. Leslie Carter, 1906 Munsey's Magazine
- Born: Caroline Louise Dudley; June 10, 1857; Lexington, Kentucky, US
- Died: November 13, 1937 (aged 80); Santa Monica, California, US
- Spouses: Leslie Carter (m. 1880; div. 1889) Louis Payne (m. 1906)
- Children: 1

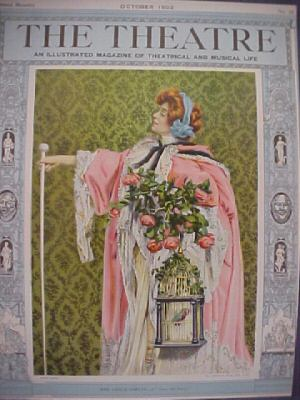
Mrs. Carter as Mme. Du Barry on the October 1902 cover of The Theatre.

Caroline Louise Dudley (June 10, 1857 – November 13, 1937), known professionally as Mrs. Leslie Carter, was an American silent film and stage actress who found fame on Broadway through collaborations with impresario David Belasco. She was a beautiful and vivacious performer with strikingly red hair, known as "The American Sarah Bernhardt". She acted under her married name, Mrs. Leslie Carter, which she continued to use even after her divorce.

== Early life ==
Caroline Dudley was born in Lexington, Kentucky. The exact date is not known but research points to the year 1857. Her father, Orson Dudley, was a wholesale dry goods merchant of means, who gave his daughter every advantage that money could bestow. Her mother was the former Catherine Dudley. Most of Dudley's childhood was spent in Dayton, Ohio. She aspired to the stage from the time she was a girl, but did not get to do so before her marriage.

In 1880, Caroline married lawyer Leslie Carter. They had one child, a son, Dudley Carter. In 1887, she filed for divorce on the grounds of physical assault and abandonment. But in 1889, Mr. Carter obtained the divorce, naming actor H. Kyrle Bellew as co-respondent. Her son, Dudley, chose to live with his mother and was cut from his father's will as a result. The filing and results of the divorce became a scandal and was covered by contemporary press.

== Career ==
Her subsequent career on stage became a success. Her association with Broadway impresario David Belasco propelled her to great theatrical fame. Her first hit was as the lead character in The Heart of Maryland (1895), set during the American Civil War. It was a huge hit. In this play, she wore a wig with six-foot tresses. Her great scene came as the heroine swinging in a belfry tower, her hands gripping the clapper to prevent the ringing of a huge curfew bell. The swinging of Mrs. Carter 35 feet above the stage, with off-stage fans used to set her long crimson tresses streaming, set New York audiences cheering.

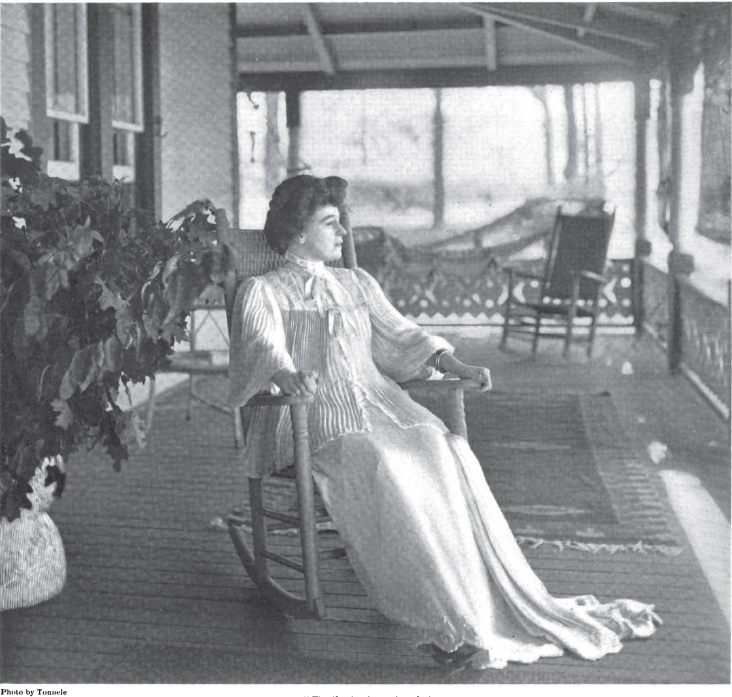
Actress Mrs. Leslie Carter in The Theatre magazine, 1902. Location: Shelter Island.

This was followed by her even more sensational successes in Zaza (1898) and Madame Du Barry (1901).

In July 1906, she married actor (William) Louis Payne (1875 – August 17, 1955). He was often her leading man on stage and later managed her business affairs. They adopted a daughter, Mary Carter Payne. She broke with Belasco after her second marriage and abandoned Broadway in favor of vaudeville.

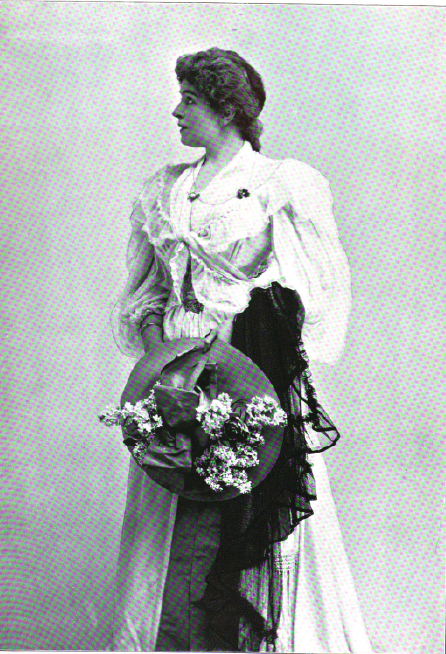
Mrs. Leslie Carter, c. 1896

In 1915, pioneer producer George Kleine hired her to recreate Madame Du Barry for the movies. She followed it with a screen version of her first success, the American Civil War melodrama The Heart of Maryland. Neither film was a success. Carter's last stage hit was in Somerset Maugham's drawing-room comedy The Circle (1921), co-starring John Drew.

Carter returned to vaudeville. In 1926, she was fired during a tryout of The Shanghai Gesture in which she had been cast as Mother Goddam. As she owned a half-interest in the show, which went on to be a Broadway success, she received half the royalties. She appeared in the road version of the show after its New York run.

=== Later years ===
Carter retired to California but returned to the screen twice in 1935, first as George F. Marion's wife in the Zane Grey western Rocky Mountain Mystery (aka The Fighting Westerner) starring Randolph Scott. She next had a small role in Becky Sharp, starring Miriam Hopkins.

She died in 1937 in Santa Monica, California of heart disease. She is buried in Woodland Cemetery, Dayton, Ohio in the family plot with her second husband, her son Dudley, and several other Dudley and Payne family members.

== Legacy ==
The ascendancy of Carter in the theatrical world was fictionalized in the film Lady with Red Hair (1940), in which she was portrayed by Miriam Hopkins. Claude Rains portrayed David Belasco. Her second husband Louis Payne was a technical adviser on the film. Louis Payne died in 1955 at the Motion Picture Country Home.

=== Ghost ===
Her ghost reportedly haunts the Theater Republic, where she got her start. If something goes wrong backstage, staff and visiting companies at The New Victory Theater say that they are being visited by the ghost of Mrs. Leslie Carter.

== Filmography ==
- The Scales of Justice (1914)
- DuBarry (1915)
- The Heart of Maryland (1915)
- The Lifeguardsman (1916)
- Rocky Mountain Mystery (1935)
- Becky Sharp (1935) (uncredited)
