= Secret History (Procopius) =

6th-century invective by Procopius

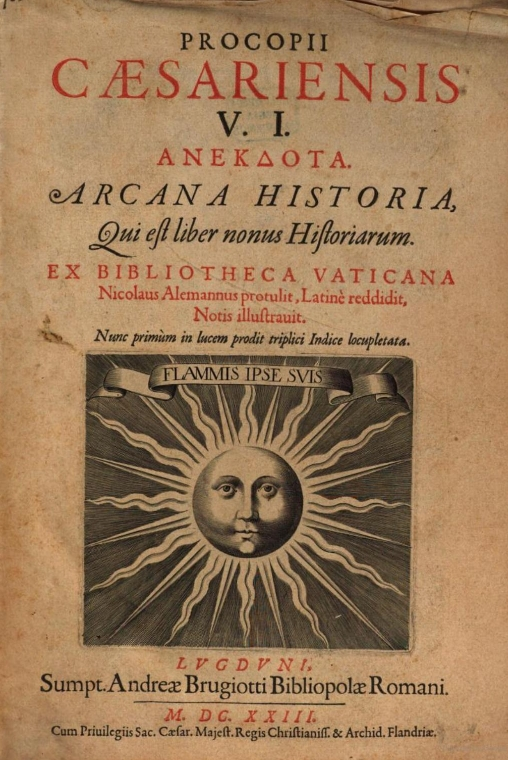
- Title of the first printed edition (Lyon, 1623)
- Author: Procopius
- Original title: Ἀνέκδοτα (Anékdota)
- Subject: Justinian I, Theodora, Belisarius and Antonina
- Genre: Invective
- Publication date: approximately 550 CE (composition)

The Secret History (Ancient Greek: Ἀπόκρυφη Ἱστορία, Apókryphe Historía; Latin: Historia Arcana), also known as the Anecdota, is an account of the reign of Byzantine emperor Justinian I written by the Greek historian Procopius of Caesarea around 550 CE. The work attacks Justinian I, his general Belisarius, and their wives Theodora and Antonina. It presents itself as a supplement to Procopius's Wars, supplying explanations that the author could not include in that work for fear of the imperial couple, and it takes the form of a vehement invective against them. Scholarly opinion on its date has clustered around two poles, 550 to 551, which is the generally preferred date, and 558 to 559. The work was not published with Procopius's other writings and is first mentioned in the tenth-century Suda. Its first printed edition was published in Lyon in 1623 by Niccolò Alemanni.

== Name ==
The 10th-century Byzantine encyclopedia Suda refers to the work as "the so-called Anecdota", a title that literally means "unpublished matters". This may have been Procopius's own title, although the Suda implies that the work may in fact have been headed the ninth book of the Wars. The manuscript tradition does not assign the work a title. Historian Sergi Grau argues that the title should be understood in the ancient sense of anekdoton, a work restricted to a single private copy, and that the association of such works with indiscreet or dangerous stories is how the word "anecdote" acquired its present meaning. The Latin title Arcana Historia appeared in Niccolò Alemanni's first edition of 1623. The historian Brian Croke regards the modern name Secret History as misleading.

== Authorship ==
Procopius was born in Caesarea Maritima in Palestine, received a traditional literary education followed by legal training, and became the assessor, or legal adviser, of the general Belisarius. He accompanied Belisarius for much of his career and saw service in the East, North Africa and Italy. His other works are the Wars, whose eight books cover Justinian's campaigns against the Persians, the Vandals and the Ostrogoths, and Buildings, an account of the chief public works undertaken during Justinian's reign.

Because the tone of the Secret History is at variance with that of the Wars and Buildings, many earlier readers concluded that it was the work of another author. The scholarly dispute over authorship was eventually settled in Procopius's favour.

In 1993, the classical scholar Kate Adshead proposed that the work consists of three separate pieces that were brought together in the eighth century and given a preface assembled from other Procopian prefaces, a view first questioned by Michael Angold. Byzantinist Anthony Kaldellis, who rejects this division, observes that style, language and technical vocabulary are consistent across all three sections of the text.

== Date ==
At four points in the text (18.33, 23.1, 24.29 and 24.33), Procopius states that Justinian had already held power for 32 years. The date of composition depends on whether these years are reckoned from the accession of Justinian's uncle Justin I in 518, which gives 550–551, or from Justinian's own elevation as emperor in 527, which gives 558–559.

Early scholars of Procopius tended to prefer 558–559 for the original date of composition. In 1891, classical philologist Jakob Haury proposed a date of late 550, which was later accepted by J. B. Bury and E. Stein and reinforced by B. Rubin and Averil Cameron. Among other points, Haury insisted that the work contains no trace of any event that can be dated after 550. In 1987, classical scholar Roger Scott argued that two measures mentioned in the work—a debasement of the coinage and a requirement concerning the date of the Jewish Passover in relation to Easter—belonged to after 550. Scholars Geoffrey Greatrex and J. A. S. Evans have maintained that neither measure needs to be dated after 550, and both reasserted Haury's date. Juan Signes Codoñer sought to explain the 550–551 date by tracing the work's origin to the expectations raised by the death of Theodora in June 548, in particular the possibility that Justinian's cousin Germanus might replace the emperor.

In 2005, Brian Croke argued that the 32 years should be counted from Justinian's accession in April 527, as Procopius counts Justinian's regnal years in the Wars, and that the work therefore reached its final form between 1 April 558 and 31 March 559. He also suggested that several episodes in the text, involving the quaestor Constantinus, the Cilician official Marthanes and the minister Peter Barsymes, could have taken place after 550. In 2009, Anthony Kaldellis replied that the 32 years represent the sum of Justinian's period of administrative power under Justin and his years as sole emperor, two periods that Procopius distinguishes at 18.45. Kaldellis further argued that Procopius's complaint that Justinian had never granted a general cancellation of tax arrears must have been written before 553, when Justinian's Novel 147 granted one. He also pointed out that the text treats Peter Barsymes as still holding the office of comes sacrarum largitionum, which he left around 555. Kaldellis concludes that the work was finished between early 550 and early 551.

== Structure and composition ==
The Secret History is composed of three main sections: chapters 1–5 recount the marriage of Belisarius and Antonina and the ways in which Antonina and Theodora combined to humiliate the general, chapters 6–18 deal with the origins, characters and regime of Justinian and Theodora, and chapters 19–30 offer a hostile commentary on Justinian's administrative, economic and legal policies.

== Contents ==
=== Preface ===
In the preface, Procopius explains that he has already narrated the wars at length but now intends to go over the same ground again, revealing what previously had to remain hidden and explaining what had been left unexplained. He admits that he fears a multitude of spies and a cruel death, and says that he could not trust even his closest relatives. He states that he hesitated to write the book in case future rulers imitated the wickedness it records, but reflected that such rulers might be deterred by the thought that their own deeds would be set down for posterity, and that his work might console those who fall into the hands of tyrants. He also expresses a fear that his account will be dismissed as beyond belief. The whole work is written as if Justinian's reign already lay in the past, and only at the very end does Procopius make clear that the emperor is still alive and on the throne.

=== Belisarius and Antonina ===
The first target of the work is Antonina, whose humble origin and affair with her adopted son Theodosius are recounted. Belisarius is accused of being weak and mercenary in his conduct of military operations and of being dominated by a spell cast over him by his wife. Procopius alleges that Antonina engineered the deposition of Pope Silverius in order to please Theodora, a matter on which he promises a fuller account in another work.

=== Justinian and Theodora ===
Procopius opens his attack on the imperial couple with a sketch of the career and character of Justin I, during whose reign, he claims, Justinian already administered the entire government. He goes on to blame Justinian for events of Justin's reign, citing the murders of the chamberlain Amantius in 518 and of the general Vitalian in 520.

Procopius presents Theodora as a former mime actress and prostitute, and describes, among other things, an obscene stage act that she performed with geese. As empress, she is depicted as domineering, and Justinian's submission to her is stressed in the same way as Belisarius's submission to Antonina. However, Procopius does not accuse Theodora of infidelity to her husband after their marriage. He claims that the Gothic queen Amalasuntha was put to death at Theodora's direction, whereas in the Wars he had presented her death simply as the act of the Gothic king Theodahad. He also relates that Theodora confined more than five hundred prostitutes in a convent named Repentance, from whose walls some threw themselves in order to escape, although in the Buildings he praises the same imperial initiative.

According to H. B. Dewing, Procopius brings forward no scandal about Justinian's private life, and that the charges against the emperor instead concern maladministration, the squandering of state funds and time wasted on the doctrinal disputes of Christians. Procopius treats Justinian's abstinence from food, drink and sleep not as a mark of piety but as proof of his demonic nature. The emperor is cast as the "Prince of Demons". Procopius lists floods at Edessa, along the Nile and at Tarsus, earthquakes at Antioch and other cities, and the Plague of Justinian of the 540s in support of his argument that Justinian brought nothing but affliction to his people. The work also discusses Justinian's persecution of older heretical groups such as the Arians and the Montanists.

=== Administration and laws ===
The final part of the work takes aim at officials and at specific administrative and legal enactments rather than at personalities. Procopius complains that Justinian had never remitted arrears owed to the treasury, had not paid the army its customary donative, and had caused his officials to lose their salaries. He accuses Justinian of abolishing the consulship, and with it the largesse that consuls used to distribute, and of reducing the public post. Among the officials attacked are the quaestor Constantinus, who is denounced as corrupt, and the official Peter Barsymes, who is said to have embezzled large sums through a monopoly on the silk trade. Near the end of the work, Procopius complains that Justinian and Theodora insisted on being addressed as "master" and "mistress" rather than as emperor and empress, and compelled their subjects to behave in the most servile manner. The key accusation that Procopius levels against Justinian is "innovation" (the disturbance of the established order), which more than anything else made him a tyrant in the historian's eyes.

== Genre, purpose, and audience ==
According to the Suda, the Secret History contains abuse and mockery of Justinian and Theodora, and also of Belisarius and his wife. The work has acquired a reputation as a masterpiece of invective, artfully composed for an educated audience and not bound by the conventions of any one genre. It is part of a tradition of invective against emperors and high officials whose techniques included holding the emperor responsible for institutions that he had inherited, presenting the harmful consequences of decisions as their original motive, and depicting the empress as a woman who violated the conventions of feminine behaviour. The Athenian playwright Aristophanes is the author most frequently cited in the work. The particular method of attack used in the Secret History is the recounting of anecdotes, which has often led to its being described as a chronique scandaleuse.

The portrayal of Theodora has been interpreted as a very traditional attempt to undermine a husband's reputation by attacking the character of his wife. Procopius also constructs Theodora's biography as an inversion of the contemporary hagiographic stories of repentant prostitutes so as to deny her any narrative of redemption.

Explanations of what prompted the work differ: some scholars, such as Averil Cameron, have seen Procopius's disillusionment with Belisarius as the trigger, while others, such as Kaldellis, hold that it was designed to expose Justinian's tyranny and to counter the picture presented in imperial propaganda. Juan Signes Codoñer has argued that Procopius drew up the work at a time when it seemed likely that Germanus would replace Justinian, partly as a means of ingratiating himself with the expected new regime. Henning Börm has argued that Procopius' criticisms are standard accusations belonging to the genre of invective rather than a heartfelt tirade. Geoffrey Greatrex considers the most plausible explanation for the existence of a separate work to be that Procopius did not outlive the emperor he wished to attack, and that the material might otherwise have been incorporated into the Wars. The work was partly a response to imperial propaganda and Procopius may not have believed in the literal truth of his own rhetoric. According to Greatrex, Procopius was taking a considerable risk in writing the Secret History, although the overt attacks of the work are matched by implicit, and occasionally explicit, criticisms in the Wars.

Procopius wrote the Secret History with particular readers in mind, including men as hostile to the regime as he was. It is possible that the philosopher Simplicius and the official and writer John the Lydian were linked to the work.

== Relationship to Procopius's other works ==
The Secret History has usually been placed before the eighth book of the Wars. In the first eighteen chapters, Procopius repeatedly refers the reader to passages of the Wars, which he designates as his earlier books. The first part of the work often explicitly corrects or supplements the narrative of the Wars, as the preface promises, whereas the final part never does so.

At 18.38, Procopius mentions a flood at Edessa and adds a cross-reference which the manuscripts give as pointing to his "earlier" books, and in Buildings the flood is described at length. However, a reference to the Buildings is unlikely, and Procopius likely had in mind the separate work on church history that he was planning. The Secret History also repeatedly attacks Justinian's building projects.

The Secret History contains three secure forward references to the projected ecclesiastical work Procopius intended to write, which was to cover Antonina's part in the deposition of Pope Silverius, the policies of Justinian and Theodora towards the Christians, and Justinian's treatment of priests. Procopius announced this project openly in the eighth book of the Wars. The work was never written, possibly because a critical treatment could not be made public while Justinian lived, and the emperor did not die until 565.

== Reliability ==
The work is marked by malicious exaggeration, deliberate misrepresentation and falsehood, notably in its account of Theodora's youth, and that the misrepresentation usually consists in attributing to Justinian the introduction of abuses already practised by his predecessors. Jakob Haury, in the prolegomena to his edition of 1906, showed that Procopius's statements are often supported by the testimony of other writers of the period.

Given the highly polemical and tendentious nature of the work, its claim that Justinian held full authority under Justin is often treated with skepticism. Procopius rhetorically exaggerates his accusations and alters his interpretation of particular edicts throughout the work. According to Geoffrey Greatrex, despite the exaggerations, Procopius's specific criticisms find confirmation in other sources when closely examined. Leslie Brubaker has characterised the work as a piece of fiction and a parody of imperial panegyric that reveals nothing about Justinian and Theodora, a judgement that Greatrex rejects.

With regard to Theodora, Byzantinist Clive Foss proposed a picture of the empress from sources other than Procopius and compared it with the historian's portrayal, reaching a conclusion that largely vindicates Procopius. Theodora's past as a prostitute is sometimes attested in sources favorable to her, such as John of Ephesus, who states that she "came from the brothel".

== Transmission and publication ==
=== Byzantine period ===
The Secret History was produced and circulated in secret, with little evidence suggesting that it was read between its composition and its modern discovery. The entry in the Suda is the earliest certain reference to it, and the suggestion that it was already known to Evagrius in the sixth century has been discounted. After the Suda it is not mentioned again until the early fourteenth century, although the twelfth-century historian John Zonaras is suspected of having had access to it. It may be possible that the Suda's notice depended on the excerptors of Procopius who worked under the patronage of Constantine VII Porphyrogenitus. Historical archaeologist Marek Jankowiak has argued that nothing supports the idea that the work circulated clandestinely until a chance rediscovery of the manuscript in the tenth century.

=== Manuscripts ===
No manuscripts or fragments of any of Procopius's works survive from the sixth to the tenth centuries. The earliest manuscript of the Secret History is the fourteenth-century Vaticanus graecus 1001, of which a copy (Vaticanus graecus 16) was made, perhaps by John Chortasmenos at Constantinople, and brought to Rome after 1443. There are other fourteenth-century manuscripts at Milan and Paris, but none from the fifteenth century.

=== Rediscovery and first edition ===
In fifteenth-century Italy the Secret History was presumed lost. In 1506, Raffaele Maffei recorded, on the authority of the Suda, that Procopius had written such a work, and noted that it had not come to light in the Vatican Library. In 1531, Beatus Rhenanus likewise knew of the work from the Suda but believed that it no longer survived. The earliest extant use of the text is found in Pierre Gilles's posthumously published book on the Thracian Bosporus (1561), which quotes it at length.

Niccolò Alemanni, a scrittore of the Vatican Library, printed the work from two manuscripts that he found there. His edition of 1623 included a Latin translation and was slightly expurgated. The first complete edition of all of Procopius's works, that of Claudius Maltretus, appeared in Paris in 1662–1663.

=== Later editions ===
Notable later editions include those of Karl Wilhelm Dindorf in the Corpus Scriptorum Historiae Byzantinae (1838), M. N. Krašeninnikov's 1899 edition, Jakob Haury's 1906 edition, and Domenico Comparetti's posthumous 1928 edition included a new Italian translation. Haury's edition of Procopius was reissued by Teubner in 1962–1964 in a revision by G. Wirth.

== Translations ==
H. B. Dewing translated Procopius for the Loeb Classical Library, whose seven Procopius volumes appeared between 1914 and 1940. Juan Signes Codoñer's Procopio de Cesarea: Historia Secreta was published in 2000. Codoñer's annotated Spanish version had been followed by revised and annotated editions of existing German and English translations, by a new English translation by Kaldellis and by a new French translation by Pierre Maraval. Anthony Kaldellis's translation, The Secret History with Related Texts, was published in 2010.

== Legacy ==
The Secret History has been one of the most frequently discussed texts concerning the historicity of Justinian I. Anthony Kaldellis describes it as perhaps the most infamous text to survive from antiquity. Interpretation of the work has strongly influenced the modern view of Theodora, of Justinian, and of their empire and era. Of Procopius' works, the Secret History continues to attract the most attention. It has also served as a model for the early modern writers of the genre of "secret history".

== See also ==
- Byzantine literature

== Sources ==
- Bryce, James (1887). "Life of Justinian by Theophilus". The English Historical Review. 2 (8): 657–686.
- Bullard, Rebecca (2014). "Section 1: Whig Secret History: the Core Traditions". The Politics of Disclosure, 1674–1725: Secret History Narratives. Pickering & Chatto. pp. 27–28. ISBN 978-1-85196-591-5.
- Croke, Brian (2005). "Procopius' Secret History: Rethinking the Date". Greek, Roman, and Byzantine Studies. 45 (4): 405–431.
- Croke, Brian (2019). "Procopius, from Manuscripts to Books: 1400–1850". Histos. Supplement 9: 1.1 – 1.173.
- Dewing, H. B. (1935). "Introduction". Procopius: The Anecdota or Secret History. Loeb Classical Library. Vol. Procopius, vol. VI. Harvard University Press.
- Grau, Sergi (2023). "Theodora, a (not so) Holy Harlot: Procopius' Secret History and the Hagiographic Narrative". Greek, Roman, and Byzantine Studies. 63: 447–465.
- Greatrex, Geoffrey (1994). "The Dates of Procopius' Works". Byzantine and Modern Greek Studies. 18: 101–114.
- Greatrex, Geoffrey (2014). "Perceptions of Procopius in Recent Scholarship". Histos. 8: 76–121.
- Kaldellis, Anthony (2004). "Identifying Dissident Circles in Sixth-Century Byzantium: The Friendship of Prokopios and Ioannes Lydos" (PDF). Florilegium. 21: 1–17.
- Kaldellis, Anthony (2009). "The Date and Structure of Prokopios' Secret History and His Projected Work on Church History". Greek, Roman, and Byzantine Studies. 49 (4): 585–616.
- Kaldellis, Anthony, ed. (2010). The Secret History: With Related Texts. Hackett Publishing. ISBN 978-1-60384-180-1.
