= Atidia gens =

Minor plebeian family of ancient Rome

The Atidia gens, also spelled Attidia, Attedia, and Atedia, was a minor plebeian family of ancient Rome. Only a few members of this gens are mentioned by Roman writers, but others are known from inscriptions. By the second century, at least one family of Attidii had attained senatorial rank, including Lucius Attidius Cornelianus, who was consul suffectus in AD 151.

== Origin ==
The nomen gentilicium Atidius is apparently identical with Atiedius, Attidius, and Atedius, which have all been found in Latin inscriptions. The name may be related to the Atiedian Brotherhood, a priestly order mentioned in the Umbrian Iguvine tablets.

== Praenomina ==
The main praenomina used by the Atidii were Gaius and Lucius, the two most common names at all periods of Roman history. Other common praenomina appear in inscriptions, including Aulus, Marcus, Publius, Quintus, Sextus, and Titus, and there are also instances of the uncommon names Numerius and Vibius.

== Members ==
This list includes abbreviated praenomina. For an explanation of this practice, see filiation.

- Attidius, a general of the Volsci named in some editions of Appian, in connection with the legends of Gnaeus Marcius Coriolanus, is the same person as Attius Tullius.
- Vibius Atiedius, made an offering to the goddess Vesune and related deities at Ortona in Samnium, recorded in an inscription dating between the late third century and the early second century BC.
- Lucius Atiedius, the master of Papia, a slave named in an inscription from Alba Fucens in Sabinum, dating from the first half of the first century BC. Together with Nichomachus, the slave of Lucius Safinius, and Dorotheus, the slave of Titus Tettienus, Papia donated a pedestal to the Bona Dea.
- Atedia Vara, named along with various slaves in an inscription from Minturnae in Latium, dating from the first half of the first century BC.
- Attidius, a Roman senator, who may be the same individual as Marcus Atilius Bulbus.
- Atidius, employed by Gaius Verres to collect tithes in Herbita, a town in Sicilia.
- Gaius Atiedius C. l. Chrussippus, a freedman, built a tomb at Dyrrachium in Macedonia, dating between the late first century BC and the end of the first century AD, for his wife, Tertia.
- Gaius Atiedius, one of the duumviri jure dicundo at Spoletium in Umbria, named in a dedicatory inscription from the Augustan era.
- Titus Atidius T. f. Porcio, a soldier in the Legio XVIII, one of three legions destroyed in the Battle of Teutoburg Forest in AD 9, according to an Augustan-era inscription from Ateste in Venetia and Histria.
- Atiedia Q. l. Communis Ithyis, a freedwoman buried at Spoletium, in a tomb dating from the early first century.
- Attidia Elena, entrusted two pots to the freedmen Gaius Valerius Hilarus and Valeria Crestina, according to an inscription from Rome, dating from the first half of the first century.
- Gaius Atiedius Gallus, named in a sepulchral inscription from Alba Fucens, dating from the first half of the first century.
- Atidia N. l. Storge, a freedwoman named in a sepulchral inscription from Rome, dating from the first half of the first century.
- Numerius Atidius Anoptes, mentioned in a first-century inscription from Rome.
- Sextus Attidius Faustus, named in a first-century inscription from Corfinium in Sabinum, as one of those engaged in work on behalf of the town.
- Atidia Ɔ. l. Tertia, a freedwoman, and the wife of Lucius Calvius Zetus, one of the Seviri Augustales, who built a first-century tomb at Cales in Campania for himself, his wife, and his patron and former master, the freedman Lucius Calvius Hedulus.
- Quintus Atedius Scaevola, buried in a first- or second-century tomb at Tergeste in Venetia and Histria.
- Gaius Attedius Secundus, buried at Byllis in Macedonia, aged sixty-five, in a tomb dedicated by his wife, Heterea Saturnina, dating between the beginning of the first century and the reign of Marcus Aurelius.
- Atidius Geminus, a praetor of Achaia who supposedly favored the Messenians in a dispute regarding the ownership of the temple of Diana Limnatis, a border shrine by the river Nedonas. According to Nino Luraghi, the ruling of Atidius must occurred after AD 21, when Augustus granted Messenian settlements such as Cardamyle to Sparta. Paul Cartledge and Anthony Spawforth date the confirmation of the decision by the Roman Senate to AD 25, but Graham Shipley dates the decree between AD 4 and 14, citing a contemporary inscription from Greece honouring Augustus and Tiberius.
- Atiedia Apollonia, the mother of a slave whose name has not been preserved. Together with the father, Hector, she dedicated a tomb for her son, dating from the middle of the first century, at Corfinium.
- Atiedius Chrestus, dedicated a tomb at Asisium in Umbria, dating from the latter half of the first century, for his wife, the freedwoman Atiedia Galene.
- Atiedia Ɔ. l. Galene, a freedwoman buried at Asisium, in a tomb dating from the latter half of the first century, built by her husband, Atiedius Chrestus.
- Gaius Flavius Atidius Castor, an aerarius, or bronzesmith, buried at Suasa in Umbria, in a second-century tomb built by Maletia Vera, his wife of thirty-six years.
- Attidia (L. f.) Juliana, honored with a second-century inscription from Attidium in Umbria.
- Lucius Attidius L. f. Latinus, one of the municipal duumvirs at Attidium, according to a second-century inscription.
- Attidia Sabinilla, buried at Attidium, in a second-century tomb dedicated by her husband, Hergenius Decenber.
- Marcus Atedius Saturninus, buried in a second-century tomb at Celtianis in Numidia, aged forty.
- Attedius Crescens, together with his wife, Valeria, dedicated a tomb at Timacum Minus in Moesia Superior, dating from the latter half of the second century or the first half of the third, for their daughters, Attedia Crescentilla and Attedia Caecilia.
- Attedia Caecilia, a girl buried at Timacum Minus, aged six, along with her sister, Attedia Crescentilla, in a tomb dedicated by her parents, Attedius Crescens and Valeria, dating from the latter half of the second century or the first half of the third.
- Attedia Crescentilla, a young woman buried at Timacum Minus, aged seventeen, along with her sister, Attedia Caecilia, in a tomb dedicated by her parents, Attedius Crescens and Valeria, dating from the latter half of the second century or the first half of the third.
- Lucius Attidius Cornelianus, consul from the Kalends of July in AD 151. His colleague was Marcus Cominius Secundus. Between 157 and 162, he was governor of Roman Syria. His term was due to end in 161, but it was extended, possibly to prevent the Parthians from taking advantage of the transfer of power, notwithstanding which he suffered defeat at the hands of the Parthian army, and was replaced by Annius Libo, a cousin of Marcus Aurelius. Géza Alföldy thought it probable that Cornelianus was from Italy.
- Atidius Auster, a centurion in the third cohort of the Legio III Augusta in AD 162.
- Atedia Rogatula, buried at Thugga in Africa Proconsularis, aged twenty-five, in a tomb dating between the late second century and the end of the third.
- Lucius Attidius Cornelianus, together with Publius Martius Verus, coöpted into the priesthood of Jove Propugnatoris at Rome, during the sixth consulship of Commodus, in AD 190.
- Attedia Q. f. Prisca, a flaminica of the imperial cult at Metellinum in Lusitania, named in an inscription dating between AD 193 and 195.
- Attidius Veris[simus?], dedicated a tomb at Spoletium, dating from the first half of the third century, for his wife, Cassia Juliana, a native of Gallia Narbonensis.
- Atidius, possibly a freedman or an individual from a Greek-speaking region, made a third-century offering to Jupiter Dolichenus at a place called Vicus Bad[...], modern Mihai Bravu, Tulcea in Romania, formerly part of Moesia Inferior.
- Attidia Felicissima, buried in a third-century Christian tomb at Rome, dedicated by her husband, Flavius Antoninus.
- Gaius Attedius Florentinus, a soldier serving in the century of Tiberius Claudius Rufinus, in the fifth cohort of the Vigiles at Rome, in AD 205.
- Attidius Praetextatus, imperial governor of Syria Palaestina, named in an inscription from the site of modern Tel Shalem in Israel, dating between AD 211 and 213.
- Attidius Praetextatus, mentioned on an inscription from Althiburos in Africa Proconsularis, may be the son or grandson of the governor Attidius Praetextatus, although they might be the same person. The inscription might identify him as the son of a consul.
- Marcus Nummius M. f. Attidius Albinus Tuscus, had been a triumvir, and quaestor designatus, as well as patron of the cities of Roman Africa, according to an inscription from Rome, dating from around AD 250, indicating that he was a Christian.
- Marcus Nummius Attidius Senecio Albinus, a senator, honored along with his wife, [...]ia Aurelia Flavia Archelais, and other members of their family, in an inscription from Rome dating between AD 262 and 270.

=== Undated Atidii ===
- Atidia C. f., buried at Amiternum in Sabinum.
- Attidius, named in a dedicatory inscription from Rome, indicating something made for his wife, Paulinianes, dated the tenth day before the Kalends of October (Note: September 22.) in an uncertain year.
- Atidia Amanda, named in an inscription from Rome.
- Atedius Carus, a potter named in an inscription from Rome.
- Lucius Attidius Critias, named in a Greek inscription from Rome.
- Lucius Atiedius L. l. Dorus, a freedman, was a scriba librarius, or library scribe, for the plebeian aediles at Rome. A Lucius Atiedius Helius, probably the son of Dorus, is named in the same inscription.
- Quintus Atedius Fortunatus, buried at Thugga. His age is incomplete, but he was at least twenty.
- Lucius Atiedius Helius, named in the same inscription as Lucius Atiedius Dorus, is described as a son, probably the son of Dorus.
- Attedia Q. f. Maxuma, buried at Narbo in Gallia Narbonensis, together with her husband of eighteen years, Gaius Manlius Rufus.
- Atedia Musina, buried at Thugga, aged thirty-five, in a sepulchre together with Quintus Clodius Privatus, aged one hundred twelve years, two months, and eight days.
- Publius Atidius Peregrinus, the firstborn son of the freedwoman Calybe, was buried at Ateste, aged nineteen, in a tomb built by his mother.
- Aulus Atidius Philetus, a potter whose makers' mark has been found on ceramics from Rome, Tusculum, and Albanum in Latium.
- Atedius Purpurius, buried at Thugga, aged forty-five.
- Gaius Atiedius Severus, named on a bronze label from an uncertain province.
- Lucius Atedius Speratus, a little boy buried at Thugga, aged three.
- Atidia Tertullia, buried at Tusculum, in a tomb dedicated by her son, Gaius Rustius Celadus.
- Atedia Victoria, buried at Thugga, aged seventy.

== Bibliography ==
- Marcus Tullius Cicero, In Verrem.
- Publius Cornelius Tacitus, Annales.
- Appianus Alexandrinus (Appian), Romaika (Roman History, or The Foreign Wars).
- Bullettino della Commissione Archeologica Comunale in Roma (Bulletin of the Municipal Archaeological Commission of Rome, abbreviated BCAR), (1872–present).
- René Cagnat et alii, L'Année épigraphique (The Year in Epigraphy, abbreviated AE), Presses Universitaires de France (1888–present).
- Theodor Mommsen et alii, Corpus Inscriptionum Latinarum (The Body of Latin Inscriptions, abbreviated CIL), Berlin-Brandenburgische Akademie der Wissenschaften (1853–present).
- Notizie degli Scavi di Antichità (News of Excavations from Antiquity, abbreviated NSA), Accademia dei Lincei (1876–present).
- Stéphane Gsell, Inscriptions Latines de L'Algérie (Latin Inscriptions from Algeria), Edouard Champion, Paris (1922–present).
- Maarten J. Vermaseren, Carel C. van Essen, The Excavations in the Mithraeum of the Church of Santa Prisca in Rome, E. J. Brill, Leiden (1965).
- Fanou Papazoglou, Inscriptions de la Mésie Supérieure (Inscriptions of Moesia Superior, abbreviated IMS), Belgrade (1976–present).
- Mustapha Khanoussi, Louis Maurin, Mourir à Dougga: Receuil des inscriptions funéraires (Dying in Dougga: a Compendium of Funerary Inscriptions, abbreviated MAD), Bordeaux, Tunis (2002).
- Barbara Pferdehirt, Römische Militärdiplome und Entlassungsurkunden in der Sammlung des Römisch-Germanischen Zentralmuseums, Mainz (2004).
- Chroniques d'Archéologie Maghrébine, Revue de l’Association historique et archéologique de Carthage (2022–present).
- Alföldy, Géza (1976). "Consuls and Consulars Under the Antonines: Prosopography and History". Ancient Society. 7: 263–299. ISSN 0066-1619.
- Arubas, Benjamin; Heinzelmann, Michael; Mevorah, David; Overman, Andrew (2019). "Capricorno Alae VII Phrygum … (i) Interim report on the fort near Tel Shalem". Journal of Roman Archaeology. 32: 201–213. doi:10.1017/S1047759419000114. ISSN 1047-7594.
- Birley, Anthony R. (1966), Marcus Aurelius (First American ed.), United States of America: Little, Brown and Company, LCCN 66-20802
- Birley, Anthony R. (2012-03-16). "The Wars and Revolts". In van Ackeren, Marcel (ed.). A Companion to Marcus Aurelius. Wiley. doi:10.1002/9781118219836. ISBN 978-1-4051-9285-9.
- Bowersock, G. W. (1971). "A Report on Arabia Provincia". The Journal of Roman Studies. 61: 219–242. doi:10.2307/300018. ISSN 1753-528X.
- Cartledge, Paul; Spawforth, Antony (1989). Hellenistic and Roman Sparta: A Tale of Two Cities. Psychology Press. ISBN 978-0-415-26277-4.
- Christoforou, Panayiotis (2023-05-25). "Greece". In Pagán, Victoria Emma (ed.). The Tacitus Encyclopedia. Wiley. doi:10.1002/9781119114567. ISBN 978-1-4443-5025-8.
- Harrer, G. A. (1916). "Consules Suffecti in the Years 98 to 101". Studies in Philology. 13 (4): 199–208. ISSN 0039-3738.
- Jones, A. H. M. (1928). "Inscriptions from Jerash". The Journal of Roman Studies. 18 (2): 144–178. doi:10.2307/296071. ISSN 1753-528X.
- de Jonge, Casper C.; Oomen, Janis; Tacoma, Laurens E.; Vis, Thirza C. C. (2025). "DYING GREEK IN ROME: GREEK FUNERARY EPIGRAMS FROM IMPERIAL ROME". Greece & Rome. 72 (2): 267–291. doi:10.1017/S0017383525100363. hdl:11370/4530bef8-db94-49e0-8409-e5e1c038a4e6. ISSN 0017-3835.
- Luraghi, Nino (2008-05-01). The Ancient Messenians: Constructions of Ethnicity and Memory. Cambridge University Press. ISBN 978-1-139-47189-3.
- McCown, C. C. (1931). "The Goddesses of Gerasa". The Annual of the American Schools of Oriental Research. 13: 129–166. doi:10.2307/3768471. ISSN 0066-0035.
- Mihailescu-Bîrliba, Lucrețiu (2020). "The Bessi at Mihai Bravu (Moesia Inferior): An Overview". Studia Academica Šumenensia (7): 159–171. ISSN 2367-5446.
- Pawlak, Marcin (2010). "Boundary Dispute Between Sparta and Messene". Classica et Christiana. Iaşi. ISSN 1842-3043.
- Pritchard, R. T. (1971). "Gaius Verres and the Sicilian Farmers". Historia: Zeitschrift für Alte Geschichte. 20 (2/3): 224–238. ISSN 0018-2311.
- Shipley, Graham (2000). "The extent of Spartan territory in the late Classical and Hellenistic periods". Annual of the British School at Athens. 95: 367–390. doi:10.1017/S0068245400004731. ISSN 2045-2403.
- Syme, Ronald (1949). "Personal Names in Annals I–VI". The Journal of Roman Studies. 39 (1–2): 6–18. doi:10.2307/297702. ISSN 1753-528X.
- Zehetner, Stefan (2016-07-01). "Cil VIII 18065 and the Ranking of Centurions". Journal of Ancient History and Archaeology. 3 (2). doi:10.14795/j.v3i2.185. ISSN 2360-266X.
