= Antonina (wife of Belisarius) =

Byzantine patrikia

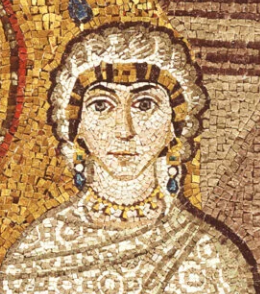
- Portion of the Theodora mosaic in the Basilica of San Vitale c. 547.
- Born: c. 484-495
- Died: after 565
- Spouse: Belisarius
- Children: Photius; Unnamed daughter (wife of Ildiger); Ioannina; Theodosius (adopted)

Antonina (Greek: Ἀντωνίνα, c. 484 or 495 – after 565) was a Byzantine patrician and wife of the general Belisarius.

The historian Procopius, who was Belisarius' legal advisor, alleges that her influence over her husband was great and features her as dominating him. The historian Paolo Cesaretti mentions her as a controversial figure and the "right arm" of the empress Theodora in the exercise of influence and power.

The chief source regarding Antonina is Procopius' Secret History, whose reliability is debated by scholars, and Procopius' Wars. Much of the information that we have regarding Antonina is uncertain and subject to speculation. However, multiple contemporary sources such as John Malalas and Liber Pontificalis corroborate Procopius' account that she orchestrated the downfalls of John the Cappadocian, the praetorian prefect, and Silverius, the Bishop of Rome.

== Family ==
Procopius records that both the father and the grandfather of Antonina were charioteers. They had performed for audiences in Constantinople and Thessalonica. The position of a charioteer was one which often necessitated moving around to different areas. It was a position which garnered much popularity for the racer, he would have been much better paid than Antonina's mother. Despite their popularity, charioteers such as Antonina's father were met with scorn by the upper classes, who looked down upon those who made entertainment their career. Procopius fails to mention the names of either Antonina's parents or grandfather. Antonina's mother, whose name is also unmentioned, was an actress. Procopius mentions her in contemptuous terms: "Her mother was one of the prostitutes attached to the theatre." The term used for "theatre" in the primary source is "thymele" (Greek: θυμέλη), equivalent to the term orchestra (Greek: ὀρχήστρα). Her position as a singer of the orchestra was a lower rung position for an actress. That was a position in the theatre reserved for performers less prestigious than the actors, such as acrobats, dancers, jugglers, etc. The term "thymelic performers" was almost always used in a negative sense. It is only Procopius' own words which suggest Antonina's mother was ever a sex worker, reflecting his generally unfavourable opinion of actresses. It does not confirm nor deny whether these notions regarding Antonina's mother were true or not.

== Early life ==
Antonina's place of birth is unconfirmed, it is possible she was born in either Thessaloniki or Constantinople, both of which places Procopius names as areas where her Grandfather or Father participated in chariot racing. She would have most likely spoken Greek, the most widely spoken language in both cities. Procopius alleges that Antonina herself had led a dissolute life, having many children prior to her marriage. This cannot be confirmed nor denied as it could be based in truth or an exaggeration made to smear her reputation by Procopius. She was married at least once before her marriage to Belisarius and had numerous children, though whether all of these children were born from this first marriage, another, or out of wedlock entirely cannot be confirmed with certainty. Two children prior to her marriage with Belisarius are confirmed, Photios and an unnamed daughter. Her mother was reportedly an actress. Some scholars conjecture she met Theodora during this time, with whom she would become lifelong friends. About Antonina, Procopius said:

"This woman, having in her early years lived a lewd sort of a life and having become dissolute in character, not only having consorted much with the cheap sorcerers who surrounded her parents, but also having thus acquired the knowledge of what she needed to know, later became the wedded wife of Belisarius, after having already been the mother of many children."

He names Photius as a son of Antonina but describes him as a son from a previous marriage, not as an illegitimate. The details of her first mentioned marriage are vague. The lack of mention of this husband in Procopius' Secret History suggest he was unlikely to have been a member of the entertainment class. His marriage to Antonina suggests he was not part of the elite, as the daughter of an actress or an actress herself, she would have been prohibited by law to marry one of the upper class until the early 520s when a law was passed during the reign of Justin I allowing such marriages. Apart from this, nothing else is able to be confirmed regarding this man or marriage. It is also unclear whether this man was the father of Antonina's confirmed children prior to her marriage with Belisarius. "But the general in supreme command over all was Belisarius, and he had with him many notable men as spearmen and guards. And he was also accompanied by Photius, the son of his wife Antonina by a previous marriage; he was still a young man wearing his first beard, but possessed the greatest discretion and shewed a strength of character beyond his years." ... "There Valentinus, the groom of Photius, the son of Antonina, made a remarkable exhibition of valour." "For Photius was by nature prone to be vexed if anyone had more influence than he with any person, and in the case of Theodosius and his associates he chanced to have a just cause to be sorely aggrieved, in that he himself, though a son, was made of no account, while Theodosius enjoyed great power and was acquiring great wealth." Photius is also mentioned by Liberatus of Carthage and John of Ephesus.

Ioannina (or Joannina) was the only confirmed daughter of Belisarius and Antonina. Procopius mentions: "she [Theodora] realized that the girl would be the heiress, since Belisarius had no other offspring". Another daughter of Antonina, whose name is never stated, is mentioned as wife of Ildiger. This marriage would have likely occurred prior to Antonina and Belisarius departure to Egypt in 533. There is little more known about the life of this woman. Ildiger is always mentioned as son-in-law of Antonina, never as son-in-law of Belisarius. Procopius records: "And the emperor sent another army also to Solomon with Theodoras, the Cappadocian, and Ildiger, who was the son-in-law of Antonina, the wife of Belisarius." ... "So the envoys of the barbarians went to Byzantium escorted by Romans, and Ildiger, the son-in-law of Antonina, came to Rome from Libya with not a few horsemen."

Finally, a granddaughter of Antonina is mentioned in the 540s. Which of Antonina's children was her parent is unrecorded and it is unconfirmed how many children, if she did bear any others than those mentioned, Antonina bore throughout her life. She was apparently wooed by Sergius, Praetorian Prefect of Africa. Procopius records

For Sergios was soft and unwarlike, quite young in years and immature of character, envious and hugely arrogant toward all people, emasculated by his tender lifestyle yet blown up with pride. But because he also happened to be a suitor for the granddaughter of Antonina, Belisarios' wife, the empress was altogether unwilling to impose any kind of punishment on him or depose him from his command

== Biography ==
Procopius portrays Antonina as leading a shameless life, even after marrying Belisarius. He writes "at great length" on her affair with Theodosius, a godson of Belisarius. She was supposedly only restrained by fear of losing the favour of her patron Theodora, wife of Justinian I (r. 527–65). She acted as an agent of Theodora in a number of occasions.

=== Vandalic War ===
Antonina is recorded as following Belisarius on campaign. Procopius alleges that she only did so to maintain her influence on the general. "For in order that the man might not be alone and thus come to himself, and scorning her enchantments might come to think as he ought concerning her, she had taken care to travel all over the world with him." She is first reported joining her husband in the Vandalic War (533–4). "In the seventh year of Justinian's reign, at about the spring equinox, the emperor commanded the general's ship to anchor off the point which is before the royal palace. ... And after this the general Belisarius and Antonina, his wife, set sail. And there was with them also Procopius, who wrote this history."

During the crossing of the Adriatic Sea the water supplies of the Byzantine navy were contaminated (spoiled). The sole exception was the water supplies of Belisarius' own ship. Antonina is credited with storing the water in glass jars and placing them in a secure room, preventing contamination. Procopius narrates:

"And setting out from Methone they reached the harbour of Zacynthus, where they took in enough water to last them in crossing the Adriatic Sea, and after making all their other preparations, sailed on. But since the wind they had was very gentle and languid, it was only on the sixteenth day that they came to land at a deserted place in Sicily near which Mount Aetna rises. And while they were being delayed in this passage, as has been said, it so happened that the water of the whole fleet was spoiled, except that which Belisarius himself and his table-companions were drinking. For this alone was preserved by the wife of Belisarius in the following manner. She filled with water jars made of glass and constructed a small room with planks in the hold of the ship where it was impossible for the sun to penetrate, and there she sank the jars in sand, and by this means the water remained unaffected."

Her precautions probably prevented the growth of algae.

In North Africa, Βelisarius initially situated his forces at "a camp, thirty-five stades distant from Decimum, surrounded it with a stockade which was very well made". He left there Antonina with the infantry. Procopius reports: "Belisarius left his wife and the barricaded camp to the infantry, and himself set forth with all the horsemen". The cavalry went on to the Battle of Ad Decimum. Antonina and the infantry joined them the following day. "But on the following day the infantry with the wife of Belisarius came up and we all proceeded together on the road toward Carthage, which we reached in the late evening".

=== Gothic War ===
Antonina is next mentioned on a mission for Theodora at Rome, the deposition of Pope Silverius (March, 537), early in the Gothic War. Procopius only alludes to the event in an unrelated chapter:

But after she [Antonina] had made her [Theodora] tame and manageable, by rendering services to her in matters of the greatest urgency — having, in the first place, disposed of Silverius in the manner which will be described in the following narrative... And they say that she first cut out all their tongues, and then cut them up bit by bit, threw the pieces into sacks, and then without ado cast them into the sea, being assisted throughout in this impious business by one of the servants named Eugenius, the same one who performed the unholy deed upon Silverius.

What deed was performed on Silverius is never actually explained. The Liber Pontificalis gives a more detailed narrative:

Augusta [Theodora] was wroth and she sent instructions to Vilisarius [Belisarius], the patrician, ... 'Find some occasion to accuse Pope Silverius and depose him from the bishopric or else send him surely and speedily to us' ... And certain false witnesses, encouraged by these instructions, came forward and said: 'We have found Pope Silverius sending letters to the king of the Goths'... Then he [Belisarius] bade Pope Silverius come to him in the Pincian palace... And Silverius went alone with Vigilius into the mausoleum and Antonina, the patrician, was lying upon a couch and Vilisarius [Belisarius], the patrician, was sitting at her feet. And when Antonina, the patrician, saw him she said to him 'Tell us, Lord Pope Silverius, what we have done to you and to the Romans that you should wish to betray us into the hands of the Goths.' While she was yet speaking John, the subdeacon of the first district, took the pallium from his neck ... and stripped him from his vestments and put him on a monk's robe and led him into hiding.

Later historians have suspected that Silverius was murdered in June 537, prior to his second trial. Antonina has been suggested as the culprit, but the new Pope Vigilius is also a suspect. Antonina is portrayed completing her mission with "ruthless efficiency" and "breathtaking speed".

Both Liberatus of Carthage and Victor of Tunnuna report that Antonina forced Pope Vigilius, early in his term, to sign a statement of faith in Monophysitism. Said statement was supposedly sent to leading monophysite bishops. This statement is not recorded by other sources and the account is considered suspect.

Antonina initially stood alongside Belisarius in the Siege of Rome (537–538). Procopius narrates:

As for Belisarius, he brought upon himself much ridicule on the part of the Romans, for though he had barely escaped from the enemy, he bade them take courage thenceforth and look with contempt upon the barbarians; for he knew well, he said, that he would conquer them decisively. Now the manner in which he had come to know this with certainty will be told in the following narrative. At length, when it was well on in the night, Belisarius, who had been fasting up to this time, was with difficulty compelled by his wife and those of his friends who were present to taste a very little bread. Thus, then, the two armies passed this night."

Later in 537, Belisarius sent Antonina to Naples, reportedly for her own safety. She did not remain idle. She assisted Procopius, at the time secretary to Belisarius, in raising a fleet which was used to transport grain and reinforcements to Rome through the port of Ostia. Procopius narrates:

Belisarius encouraged the Roman populace and then dismissed them; and Procopius, who wrote this history, he immediately commanded to go to Naples. For a rumour was going about that the emperor had sent an army there. And he [Belisarius] commissioned him [Procopius] to load as many ships as possible with grain, to gather all the soldiers who at the moment had arrived from Byzantium, or had been left about Naples in charge of horses or for any other purpose whatever — for he had heard that many such were coming to the various places in Campania — and to withdraw some of the men from the garrisons there, and then to come back with them, convoying the grain to Ostia, where the harbour of the Romans was. ... So he commanded Martinus and Trajan with a thousand men to go to Tarracina. And with them he sent also his wife Antonina, commanding that she be sent with a few men to Naples, there to await in safety the fortune which would befall the Romans. ... But Martinus and Trajan passed by night between the camps of the enemy, and after reaching Tarracina sent Antonina with a few men into Campania... But as for Procopius, when he reached Campania, he collected not fewer than five hundred soldiers there, loaded a great number of ships with grain, and held them in readiness. And he was joined not long afterwards by Antonina, who immediately assisted him in making arrangements for the fleet.

James Evans suggests that Procopius might have exaggerated his own role, Antonina herself being the envoy responsible for organizing the grain shipment.

Antonina is recorded facing the problem of "the fleet of the Isaurians" arriving at Ostia. Their cargoes had to be transported to Rome. But the oxen that were to pull the barges up the Tiber River were exhausted, "all lay half-dead". The road on one side of the Tiber was held by the Goths, the other was too narrow and "altogether unused". Procopius narrates:

Antonina together with the commanders began at daybreak to consider means of transporting the cargoes. ... They therefore selected the small boats belonging to the larger ships, put a fence of high planks around them on all sides, in order that the men on board might not be exposed to the enemy's shots, and embarked archers and sailors on them in numbers suitable for each boat. And after they had loaded the boats with all the freight they could carry, they waited for a favouring wind and set sail toward Rome by the Tiber, and a portion of the army followed them along the right bank of the river to support them. But they left a large number of Isaurians to guard the ships. Now where the course of the river was straight, they found no trouble in sailing, simply raising the sails of the boats; but where the stream wound about and took a course athwart the wind, and the sails received no impulse from it, the sailors had no slight toil in rowing and forcing the boats against the current. As for the barbarians, they sat in their camps and had no wish to hinder their enemy, either because they were terrified at the danger, or because they thought that the Romans would never by such means succeed in bringing in any provisions, and considered it contrary to their own interest, when a matter of no consequence was involved, to frustrate their hope of the armistice which Belisarius had already promised. Moreover, the Goths who were in Portus, though they could see their enemy constantly sailing by almost near enough to touch, made no move against them, but sat there wondering in amazement at the plan they had hit upon. And when the Romans had made the voyage up the river many times in the same way, and had thus conveyed all the cargoes into the city without interference, the sailors took the ships and withdrew with all speed, for it was already about the time of the winter solstice; and the rest of the army entered Rome, except, indeed, that Paulus remained in Ostia with some of the Isaurians."

Procopius elsewhere blames her for the death of Constantinus (Constantine) in late 537.

And not long afterwards Belisarius, persuaded by his wife, killed Constantinus also. For at that time fell the affair of Presidius and the daggers, as has been set forth by me in the preceding narrative. For though the man was about to be acquitted, Antonina would not relent until she had punished him for the remark [against her] which I have just mentioned."

Antonina probably stayed in the Praetorian prefecture of Italy for the period 538–540, but her activities are not recorded. Procopius simply mentions Belisarius and Antonina's return to Constantinople in 540. Belisarius had been recalled to participate in a new war against the Sassanid Empire. Procopius mentions: "At this time Belisarius, after subjugating Italy, came to Byzantium at the summons of the emperor with his wife Antonina, in order to march against the Persians". He also mentions that her lover Theodosius returned with them. "There [Italy] she enjoyed to the full both the attentions of her lover and the simplicity of her husband and later on came to Byzantium in company with both of them."

=== Downfall of the Cappadocian ===
In Constantinople, Antonina allied with Theodora against John the Cappadocian, the Praetorian prefect of the East. His downfall in 541 seems to have been the result of an ongoing rivalry with Thedora, their distaste for each other having appeared to have been the result of an ongoing competition for greater influence than the other over the emperor. (pg 130) For Antonina, her reason for partaking in the downfall of John the Cappadocian is not concretely known, but it could have been prompted by either the desire to eliminate a political opponent to herself and Belisarius, or because of personal dislike of the man for his handling of the food provision for the Roman Army during the Vandalic Wars. John and Theodora competed for influence over Justinian and each brought forth accusations concerning their rival's activities. Belisarius had reportedly gained much popular support following his return from the Gothic War and the Cappadocian perceived him as a rival favourite.

Procopius narrates the fall of the Cappadocian. "Belisarius enjoyed an unequalled popularity. And it was on him that the hope of the Romans centred as he marched once more against the Persians, leaving his wife in Byzantium. Now Antonina, the wife of Belisarius, (for she was the most capable person in the world to contrive the impossible), purposing to do a favour to the empress, devised the following plan. John had a daughter, Euphemia, who had a great reputation for discretion, but a very young woman and for this reason very susceptible; this girl was exceedingly loved by her father, for she was his only child. By treating this young woman kindly for several days Antonina succeeded most completely in winning her friendship, and she did not refuse to share her secrets with her. And on one occasion when she was present alone with her in her room she pretended to lament the fate which was upon her, saying that although Belisarius had made the Roman empire broader by a goodly measure than it had been before, and though he had brought two captive kings and so great an amount of wealth to Byzantium, he found Justinian ungrateful; and in other respects she slandered the government as not just. Now Euphemia was overjoyed by these words, for she too was hostile to the present administration by reason of her fear of the empress, and she said: "And yet, dearest friend, it is you and Belisarius who are to blame for this, seeing that, though you have opportunity, you are not willing to use your power." And Antonina replied quickly: "It is because we are not able, my daughter, to undertake revolutions in camp, unless some of those here at home join with us in the task. Now if your father were willing, we should most easily organize this project and accomplish whatever God wills." When Euphemia heard this, she promised eagerly that the suggestion would be carried out, and departing from there she immediately brought the matter before her father."

And he [John] was pleased by the message (for he inferred that this undertaking offered him a way to the fulfilment of his prophecies and to the royal power), and straightway without any hesitation he assented, and bade his child arrange that on the following day he himself should come to confer with Antonina and give pledges. When Antonina learned the mind of John, she wished to lead him as far as possible astray from the understanding of the truth, so she said that for the present it was inadvisable that he should meet her, for fear lest some suspicion should arise strong enough to prevent proceedings; but she was intending straightway to depart for the East to join Belisarius. When, therefore, she had quit Byzantium and had reached the suburb (the one called Rufinianae which was the private possession of Belisarius), there John should come as if to salute her and to escort her forth on the journey, and they should confer regarding matters of state and give and receive their pledges. In saying this she seemed to John to speak well, and a certain day was appointed to carry out the plan. And the empress, hearing the whole account from Antonina, expressed approval of what she had planned, and by her exhortations raised her enthusiasm to a much higher pitch still.

When the appointed day was at hand, Antonina bade the empress farewell and departed from the city, and she went to Rufinianae, as if to begin on the following day her journey to the East; hither too came John at night in order to carry out the plan which had been agreed upon. Meanwhile, the empress denounced to her husband the things which were being done by John to secure the tyranny, and she sent Narses, the eunuch, and Marcellus, the commander of the palace guards to Rufinianae with numerous soldiers, in order that they might investigate what was going on, and, if they found John setting about a revolution, that they might kill the man forthwith and return. So these departed for this task. But they say that the emperor got information of what was being done and sent one of John's friends to him forbidding him on any condition to meet Antonina secretly. But John (since it was fated that he should fare ill), disregarding the emperor's warning, about midnight met Antonina, close by a certain wall behind which she had stationed Narses and Marcellus with their men that they might hear what was said. There, while John with unguarded tongue was assenting to the plans for the attack and binding himself with the most dread oaths, Narses and Marcellus suddenly set upon him. But in the natural confusion which resulted the body-guards of John (for they stood close by) came immediately to his side. And one of them smote Marcellus with his sword, not knowing who he was, and thus John was enabled to escape with them, and reached the city with all speed. And if he had had the courage to go straightway before the emperor, I believe that he would have suffered no harm at his hand; but as it was, he fled for refuge to the sanctuary, and gave the empress opportunity to work her will against him at her pleasure."

Elsewhere he continues: "But in the other account one fact was passed over in silence by me through fear — that Antonina had practised deception upon John and his daughter, not without intent, but after giving them the assurance of countless oaths, than which none is accounted more terrible among Christians, at any rate, that she was not acting with any treacherous purpose towards them. So after she had completed this transaction and felt a much greater confidence in the friendship of the Empress, she sent Theodosius to Ephesus and herself, foreseeing no obstacle, set out for the East." ... "There the Empress made an exhibition before all mankind, shewing that she knew how to requite bloody favours with greater and more unholy gifts. For whereas Antonina had recently laid snares for one enemy for her, the Cappadocian, and had betrayed him, she herself delivered over to Antonina a host of men and brought about their destruction without even a charge having been brought against them."

Antonina's role in this political saga displayed a woman who was a talented political operative, and was involved in intrigue of the highest degree. She had directly outplayed a very important and powerful figure in Justinian's circle, taking a large role in his downfall.

=== Strained relations ===
Antonina joined her husband in the Lazic War. But her affair with Theodosius caused a strain in their relations. Her lack of discretion led to a public confrontation. Her relations with Photius had reportedly also deteriorated. Belisarius was able to convince Photius to act as his own agent.

"Accordingly the two men swore to each other all the oaths which are the most terrible among the Christians and are in fact so designated by them, that they would never betray each other, even in the presence of dangers threatening their destruction."

Antonina reportedly reached Belisarius shortly following his return from the fortress of Sisauranon.

"It was reported to him by someone that she was on the way. Whereupon he, counting all other things as of no importance, led his army back. For it so happened that certain other things too, as related by me previously, had occurred in the army which influenced him to this retreat. This information, however, led him much more quickly to the decision. ... "For from the first he was so constrained by the misconduct of his wife that he had been quite unwilling to get to a region as distant as possible from Roman territory, in order that he might be able, as soon as he learned that the woman had come from Byzantium, to turn back and to catch and to punish her immediately."

Belisarius arrested Antonina, while Photius was sent to Ephesus against Theodosius.

"When Belisarius had reached Roman territory, he found that his wife had arrived from Byzantium. And he kept her under guard in disgrace, and though he many times set about destroying her, his heart was softened, being vanquished, as it seems to me, by a sort of flaming-hot love. But they say that it was also through her magic arts that he was brought under the control of the woman and immediately undone."

At this point, Theodora intervened in the behalf of her ally. She summoned both Belisarius and Antonina back to Constantinople. Then turned her wrath on various "intimates" of Belisarius and Photius. The couple were reconciled on Theodora's order, though the empress still had to find the whereabouts of Theodosius. Photius had abducted the youth and hidden him.

"And she [Theodora] forced Belisarius, quite against his will, to become reconciled with his wife Antonina. She then inflicted sundry servile tortures upon Photius, among others combing his back and his shoulders with many lashes and commanded him to tell where in the world Theodosius and the go-between were. But he, though being racked with torture, determined to hold fast to his oath; for though he was a sickly person and had in earlier life been dissolute, yet he had been devoted to the care of his body, having experienced neither wanton treatment nor hardship. At any rate, he disclosed not one of the secrets of Belisarius. At a later time, however, everything which hitherto had remained secret came to light."

In other words, Theodora located Theodosius and hid him in the palace. Later offering him as a gift to Antonina, allowing the affair to continue.

"And she [Theodora] brought Theodosius out of the room of one of the eunuchs and shewed him to her [Antonina]. And Antonina was so overjoyed that she at first remained speechless with pleasure, and then she acknowledged that Theodora had done her a great favour, calling her Saviour and Benefactor and Mistress in very truth. And so the Empress detained this Theodosius in the Palace and bestowed upon him luxury and all manner of indulgence, and threatened that she would make him a Roman General after no long time. But a sort of justice forestalled her, for he was seized by an attack of dysentery and removed from the world."

Belisarius fell out of favor in late 542–543, through unrelated causes. In the Summer of 542, Constantinople was affected by the so-called Plague of Justinian. The emperor Justinian himself caught the plague and there were discussions of an imminent succession. Belisarius and Bouzes, both absent in campaign, reportedly swore to oppose any emperor chosen without their consent. Theodora took offense and had them both recalled at Constantinople to face her judgement. Bouzes was captured upon his return. He would reportedly spend two years and four months (late 542-early 545) held in an underground chamber, located below the women's quarters of the palace. While eventually released, Procopius suggests that Bouzes continued to suffer from a failing eyesight and ill health for the rest of his life.

"Such was the experience of Bouzes. As for Belisarius, though he was convicted of none of the charges, the Emperor, at the insistence of the Empress, relieved him of the command which he held and appointed Martinus to be General of the East in his stead, and instructed him to distribute the spearmen and guards of Belisarius and all his servants who were notable men in war to certain of the officers and Palace eunuchs. So these cast lots for them and divided them all up among themselves, arms and all, as each happened to win them. And many of those who had been his friends or had previously served him in some way he forbade to visit Belisarius any longer. And he went about, a sorry and incredible sight, Belisarius a private citizen in Byzantium, practically alone, always pensive and gloomy, and dreading a death by violence." Procopius credits Antonina with his restoration to favor.

=== Later years ===
Restored to favor, Belisarius reportedly attempted to reclaim the position of magister militum per orientem. But Antonina prevented any reappointment to the eastern front, which brought back painful memories to her:

"Now Belisarius made the request that he should receive back his proper office and, upon being designated General of the East, should again lead the Roman army against Chosroes and the Medes, but Antonina would have none of it; for she maintained that she had been insulted by him in those regions, and never would he again set eyes upon them. [...] He, however, disregarding all that had happened, and forgetting completely and neglecting the oaths which had been sworn to Photius and his other kinsmen, meekly followed the woman, being extraordinarily smitten with her, though she was already sixty years of age."

This estimate of her age places her birth at c. 484 AD.

Belisarius was sent back (544) to the Gothic War, and Antonina followed him. Procopius gives some glimpses of her movements. She was at Portus in 546, at Croton in late 547, and at Hydruntum in 548. She was then sent to Constantinople with the mission of pressing the need for reinforcements for the Gothic War. She arrived to find Theodora had already died (in June 548). Antonina instead convinced Justinian to recall Belisarius.

In the 540s Antonina's daughter Ioannina had married Anastasius, a grandson of Theodora. In early 549 Antonina broke up this marriage. Procopius reports:

"But when Antonina, after the Empress' death, came to Byzantium, she purposely forgot the benefits which the Empress recently had conferred upon her, and paying no attention whatever to the fact that if the girl should marry anyone else, her previous record would be that of a prostitute, she spurned the alliance with the offspring of Theodora and forced the child, entirely against her will, to abandon her beloved. And from this act she [Antonina] won a great reputation for ingratitude among all mankind, yet when her husband arrived, she had no difficulty in persuading him to share with her in this unholy business. Consequently the man's character was openly revealed at that time."

This might be the last reliable mention of Antonina. The Patria of Constantinople, a later 10th-century source, mentions that Antonina outlived Belisarius, which would make her still alive in 565. She reportedly went to live with Vigilantia, sister of Justinian. She supposedly persuaded Vigilantia to build a church dedicated to Procopius of Scythopolis. The same late source gives Antonina the title zoste patrikia. If so, she would have been the first known holder of this title. A number of later historians have accepted this account, but the lack of other evidence on the matter renders it doubtful.

== Issues with sourcing ==
The main source for Antonina is Procopius (particularly his Secret History), this causes a number of problems. The Secret History is a polemic aimed at the imperial administration, the purpose of the text and its reliability are still under question.

We are told of certain movements of Antonina around the Mediterranean from Procopius' Wars, during the conquests of North Africa and Italy.

The first section of the Secret History focuses largely on Antonina. Procopius describes Antonina as the daughter of a prostitute, something that Roman elites equated with stage actors. It is uncertain which Procopius means, and whether this is to be taken as true or libel. This is similar to what Procopius writes of Theodora (who is described as an ex-prostitute/actress). Antonina is also described as having lain with her adopted son while married to Belisarius. All of this being potentially taken from a 'long tradition of sexual slander... [a] rhetorical invention'. Though this does not necessarily mark Procopius' writings as untrue.

== Interpretation ==
Lynda Garland has noted that our main source for both Antonina and Theodora is Procopius. He served as the secretary and legal adviser of Belisarius from 527 and 540. He then went on to become a member of the Byzantine Senate. He must have known Antonina intimately and his position would allow him to chronicle the activities of both women. In fact, his Secret History seems to have started with Antonina as his main target. The initial chapters focus on Antonina. Only later chapters start targeting Theodora and Justinian.

There are certainly facts underlying Procopius' account. But the most extravagant details of the debaucheries of the women, arguably follow a tradition of invective writings against "wicked women". Antonina's talent for intrigue can be seen in her role in the downfalls of Pope Silverius and John the Cappadocian. She succeeded in making Silverius appear a pro-Gothic traitor and implicated John "in a conspiracy to gain the throne". Procopius here reveals his own inside knowledge of events and personalities. The background of Antonina can be guessed to match that of Theodora and their friendship might predate their rise to power.

Procopius in several chapters argues that Antonina was "skilful in magic", an account not taken seriously by later historians. James Evans examines what we know of Antonina and what remains uncertain.

We have little or no information on the early life of Antonina. She might have been part of the demimonde involved in the theater of her age. We can not be certain how and when Antonina and Theodora met. Theodora could have initially recruited her as an agent and informer. While their relationship was durable enough, Evans points that it was an "uneven relationship".

We do not know when or how Antonina and Belisarius met. Theodora might have a hand in introducing her friend to the young guardsman. The Augusta could then have helped push Belisarius to a command position, which would explain the rapid rise of Belisarius. Antonina certainly served as the intermediary between Belisarius and Theodora in later stages. Antonina was no longer young at the time of her marriage, though her having several children could be no more than rumour. The best attested child is arguably Photius, who gained a reputation for cruelty when suppressing the Samaritan Revolts (550s–570s).

Belisarius is portrayed as a devoted husband, Antonina as unfaithful. She accompanied her husband in campaigns and had a role in the operations, while also serving, if Procopius is to be taken at face-value, as the ruthless agent of Theodora. A less amiable side in the relations of the two women can be seen in the marriage of Ioannina and Anastasius. Theodora clearly envisioned her grandson as the heir to an immense fortune. She was the one to arrange the marriage to the heiress. The marriage probably took place between 542 and 544, when Belisarius had fallen out of favor. Belisarius and Antonina were clearly in no position to argue. When Antonina kept postponing the marriage, Theodora took the initiative. She arranged for the young couple to start living together, unmarried. The wedding had to be hastened to preserve the reputation of the girl.

Evans also calls attention to the relation between Antonina and Theodosius. The "handsome young Thracian" had come under the protection of Belisarius in the early 530s. At least prior to the Vandalic War. He was treated as an adoptive son of Belisarius, though not apparently legally adopted. He would have been the heir of Belisarius if adopted, not Ioannina. The affair "blossomed" in the Vandalic War and continued in the Gothic War. It was apparently common knowledge among the staff of Belisarius. Yet Belisarius was apparently blissfully unaware at first. A slave girl attempted to tell him but was disbelieved and delivered to Antonina for punishment. Photius is reported resenting Theodosius and disgusted by his mother. Acting as a "rejected child", if not a devoted stepson. Theodosius himself might have been a little scared of his lover. He reportedly attempted once to escape her and become a monk. Antonina persuaded both Belisarius and Justinian to recall him.

When Theodora discovered the whereabouts of the abducted Theodosius and returned him to Antonina, her intentions might not have been altruistic: she could have been just repaying a favor, as Procopius viewed the event. Evans, however, deduces that Theodora used the affair to further bind Antonina to herself.

== See also ==
- Antonina: A Byzantine Slut a novelization of Antonina's life

== Sources ==
- Bury, John Bagnell (1923), History of the Later Roman Empire from the Death of Theodosius I to the Death of Justinian
- Cameron, Averil (1985), Procopius and the Sixth Century
- Evans, James Allan (2003), The Empress Theodora:Partner of Justinian, University of Texas Press, ISBN 978-0-292-70270-7
- Garland, Lynda (1999), Byzantine empresses:women and power in Byzantium, AD 527–1204, Routledge, ISBN 978-0-415-14688-3
- Lightman, Marjorie; Lightman, Benjamin (2007), A to Z of ancient Greek and Roman women, revised edition, Infobase Publishing, ISBN 978-0-8160-6710-7
- Loomis, Louise Ropes (1916), The Book of the Popes (Liber Pontificalis, Columbia University Press
- Martindale, John R.; Jones, A.H.M.; Morris, John (1992), The Prosopography of the Later Roman Empire, Volume III: AD 527–641, Cambridge University Press, ISBN 0-521-20160-8
- Moorhead, John (1994), Justinian, University of Virginia, ISBN 978-0-582-06303-7
- Parnell, David Alan (2023). Belisarius & Antonina: love and war in the age of Justinian. New York, NY: Oxford University Press. ISBN 9780197574706.
- Procopius of Caesarea; Dewing, Henry Bronson (1914), History of the wars. vol. 1, Books I-II, Cambridge University Press
- Procopius of Caesarea; Dewing, Henry Bronson (1914), History of the wars. vol. 2, Books III-IV, Cambridge University Press
- Procopius of Caesarea; Dewing, Henry Bronson (1914), History of the wars. vol. 3, Books V-VI, Cambridge University Press
- Procopius of Caesarea; Dewing, Henry Bronson (1935), Secret History, Cambridge University Press
- Procopius, Complete Works vol. 3, Greek ed. by K. W. Dindorf, Latin trans. by Claude Maltret in Corpus Scriptorum Historiae Byzantinae Pars II Vol. 3, 1838. (Secret History, Buildings of Justinian)
