= Stasis (ancient Greece) =

Civil strife in Ancient Greek cities

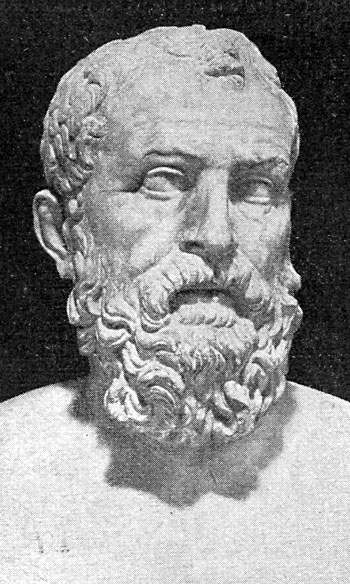

In political history, stasis (Ancient Greek: στάσις in the sense of "faction, discord"; plural: staseis) refers to an episode of civil strife within an ancient Greek city-state or polis. It was the result of opposition between groups of citizens, fighting over the constitution of the city or over social and economic problems. Staseis were endemic throughout the ancient Greek world, in mainland Greece as well as in the colonies of Magna Graecia. With 19 episodes of civil strife between 650 and 214 BCE, Syracuse, in Sicily, was the city with the most recorded staseis. However, since many staseis were only recorded by chance or incidentally, it can be assumed that there are many unreported cases: some modern historians believe that there were over 20,000 cases in the 5th and 4th centuries alone (Arcenas 2026, p. 2f.).

== Stasis in Ancient Greece ==
For centuries, stasis was an important factor in Greek history, and not only in Athens: Almost every major polis suffered from violent stasis at least once between the sixth and first centuries BCE, and many more than once (Lintott 1982; Gehrke 1985; Berger 1992). It has been argued that the Greek cities were largely pacified only at the end of the Hellenistic era with the establishment of the Roman Empire (Börm 2019). Historians have long recognized the importance of stasis and have discussed the question of the causes of stasis. The explanations proposed can be subsumed under four models:

- Some scholars believe that outbreaks of violence in a polis were caused primarily by the involvement of the parties in external conflicts. According to this model, stasis thus was a by-product of interstate conflict (e. g. Eberhard Ruschenbusch).
- A second explanation identifies economic inequality, social tensions, and class struggle as the real roots of stasis. Scholars who follow this model, particularly prominent in British research (e. g. G. E. M. de Ste. Croix), argue that the ancient actors alleged other reasons, in particular the struggle between oligarchs and democrats, to put an ideological veneer on conflicts that were primarily economic in nature.
- Proponents of the third model agree with the second insofar as they also believe that the real motives of the historical actors were often concealed. However, scholars such as Hans-Joachim Gehrke and Henning Börm argue that stasis was essentially the product of power struggles among polis elites: competing factions mobilized the citizenry merely as pawns in their struggle against their rivals, who themselves were members of the elite. According to this view, honor and vengeance were often the motives for the violent escalation of conflicts. According to the Iliad, the goal of all men of honour in Archaic Greece was to "always be the first and superior to the others". This ideal was called the aristeuein- or aristeia-Ideal. In Homer's days, this ideal was mainly based on performance skills in speaking and fighting, and included wisdom, self-restraint, loyalty, and bravery (e.g., leading armies in the front row). For decades, prestige, which was a requisite for might, originated in speaking ability and military virtues. This is true for the cases of both Solon and Peisistratos by Herodotus and by Aristotle in the Athenaion Politeia.
- Finally, some scholars suggest stasis was a natural manifestation of a conflictual model of political life (e.g. Nicole Loraux). This reading suggests that such conflict is endemic to democracy, rather than the product of problematic dynamics either within or without. This relates to political theorists who draw on Greek city states in telling the story of agonism as the fundamental dynamic of democratic political life.

== Bibliography ==
- Scott L. Arcenas: Political Violence in Ancient Greece. Quantitative and Qualitative Approaches to Stasis, 500–301 BCE. Cambridge 2026.
- Moshe Berent: Stasis, or the Greek invention of Politics. In: History of Political Thought 19, 1998, pp. 331ff.
- Shlomo Berger: Revolution and Society in Greek Sicily and Southern Italy. Stuttgart 1992.
- Iain Bruce: The Corcyraean Civil War of 427 B. C. In: Phoenix 25, 1971, pp. 108ff.
- Henning Börm: Stasis in Post-Classical Greece. The Discourse of Civil Strife in the Hellenistic World. In: Henning Börm, Nino Luraghi (eds.): The Polis in the Hellenistic World. Stuttgart 2018, pp. 53ff. online.
- Henning Börm: Mordende Mitbürger. Stasis und Bürgerkrieg in griechischen Poleis des Hellenismus (= Historia-Einzelschriften 258). Stuttgart 2019.
- Hans-Joachim Gehrke: Stasis. Untersuchungen zu den inneren Kriegen in den griechischen Staaten des 5. und 4. Jh. v. Chr. (= Vestigia 35). Munich 1985.
- Benjamin Gray: Stasis and Stability. Oxford 2015.
- Mogens Herman Hansen: Stasis as an essential Aspect of the Polis. In: M. H. Hansen, T. H. Nielsen (eds.): An inventory of Archaic and Classical Poleis. Oxford 2004, pp. 124ff.
- Nick Fisher: Hybris, revenge and stasis in the Greek city-states. In: H. van Wees (ed.): War and Violence in Ancient Greece. London 2000, pp. 83ff.
- Andrew Lintott: Violence, Civil Strife and Revolution in the Classical City 750–330 BC. London 1982.
- Dirk Loenen: Stasis. Enige aspecten van de begrippen partij- en klassen strijd in Oud-Griekenland. Amsterdam 1953.
- Nicole Loraux: The Divided City. New York 2002.
- Jonathan J. Price: Thucydides and internal war. Cambridge 2001.
- Eberhard Ruschenbusch: Untersuchungen zu Staat und Politik in Griechenland. Vom 7. - 4. Jh. v. Chr. Bamberg 1978.
- G. E. M. de Ste. Croix: The Class Struggle in the Ancient Greek World. London 1981.
- Hans van Wees: "Stasis, Destroyer of Men": Mass, Elite, Political Violence and Security in Archaic Greece. In: C. Brélaz et al. (eds.): Sécurité Collective et Ordre Public dans les Sociétés Anciennes. Geneva 2008, pp. 1–39.
- Ronald L. Weed: Aristotle on Stasis. A Moral Psychology of Political Conflict. Berlin 2007.
- Aloys Winterling: Polisbegriff und Stasistheorie des Aeneas Tacticus. Zur Frage der Grenzen der griechischen Polisgesellschaften im 4. Jahrhundert v. Chr. In: Historia 40, 1991, pp. 195ff.
- Giorgio Agamben: Stasis: Civil War as a Political Paradigm. Stanford 2015.
