= Juan Signes Codoñer =

Spanish professor of classical studies

Juan Signes Codoñer (born 1964) is a Spanish professor of Classical and Byzantine studies at the Complutense University of Madrid.

== Biography ==
He is the son of Carmen Codoñer Merino, who was a professor of Latin at the University of Salamanca. He studied classical philology at Salamanca, where he earned his degree in 1987. He learned German and Modern Greek and obtained a scholarship from the German Academic Exchange Service to study Byzantine studies at the Dahlem, Lower Saxony campus of the Free University of Berlin under professor Paul Speck. In 1989, he obtained another scholarship to conduct his doctoral research at the Complutense University of Madrid under the supervision of Antonio Bravo García, with whom he spent four years until earning his doctorate in 1993. Following a postdoctoral fellowship in Vienna in 1995, he secured a position as an assistant lecturer at the Complutense. He competed for and secured a tenured position at the University of Valladolid in September 1996, and obtained a full professorship in 2008. Codoñer is a President of the Spanish Society of Byzantine Studies and Vice President of the International Society of Byzantine Studies.

== Works ==
- Gemistos Plethon (c. 1355/1360-1452), Madrid, Ed. del Orto, 1998.
- Michael Psellos, Lives of the Emperors of Byzantium: Translation, Notes, and Introduction, Madrid, Gredos, 2005.
- Procopius, Secret History, Madrid, Gredos, 2000.
- Kekaumenos, Advice from a Byzantine Aristocrat, Madrid, Alianza Editorial, 2000.
