= Count No Man Happy: A Byzantine Fantasy =

2011 book by Paul Kastenellos

- Author: Paul Kastenellos
- Language: English
- Genre: Historical
- Publisher: Apuleius Books
- Publication date: 2011
- Publication place: United States
- Media type: Print (paperback)
- Pages: 234 pp
- ISBN: 978-0983910800

Count No Man Happy: A Byzantine Fantasy is a novel or fictionalized biography published in 2011 by author Paul Kastenellos. Count No Man Happy recounts the life of the Byzantine emperor Constantine VI who lived in the last years of the eighth century AD. Although a novel with elements of fantasy, it is also factually correct biography. The book’s title is a quote from the ancient historian Herodotus: “Count no man happy until he is dead.” The unhappy life of Constantine was one of religious extremism, court intrigue, family feuding, and a two-front war. This reality is relieved by Constantine's dreams in which he is comforted by Beth, a mid twentieth century model inspired by the smile of the pinup model Bettie Page.

== Plot ==
Constantine was the child of the iconoclastic emperor Leo IV and the Empress Irene. Upon Leo's death Irene showed her true colors by reintroducing the veneration of icons throughout the empire. She also ended the engagement of the young Constantine to a daughter of Charlemagne and arranged a loveless marriage with a beautiful but malleable Greek girl. She was power hungry and would not surrender authority to her son when he came of age to rule, instead employing the talents of her chief minister, Stauratius, who, as a eunuch, did not threaten the throne.

Irene and Stauratius failed to forestall the intrigues of Constantine's uncle Nicephorus who thought himself entitled to rule. The result was a growing estrangement between mother and son, and the treachery of Nicephorus. Irene ignored the rivalry between Constantine and Stauratius, seemingly not caring about her son's various victories and defeats against Bulgar and Arab enemies but only about restoring the icons and remaining in power. Finally there was open warfare between the two factions.

For a time Irene retired from power but after a year returned to the palace to share authority with her son. Then Constantine divorced his wife who had been charged with treason and married a handmaiden. As Irene had foreseen, the monks and people of Constantinople would not accept this and there was renewed feuding. Yet Constantine had supporters and in desperation to remain in power Irene authorized the blinding of her own son.

== Characters ==
The main characters are Constantine, his mother, Irene, their advisers the eunuchs Stauratius and Aetius, and Constantine's evil uncle, Nicephorus. All these are actual historical figures whom the author tries to portray as accurately as the limited source material from eighth century Byzantium permits. Fictional characters are Beth and two knights from Charlemagne's court, Ricolf and Bertmund.

Constantine's biography is accurate as are the feuding and rebellions over the place or icons in churches. The details of Constantine's battles with Bulgar and Arab enemies are fictionalized but the causes, settings, and results are not.

The character of Beth gives relief and empathy to the biography of a protagonist who is usually portrayed as merely living in the shadow of his mother, who is described in Philip Schaff's History of the Christian Church as being "distinguished for beauty, talent, ambition and intrigue, was at heart devoted to image-worship." Constantine was an effective military leader who held the empire intact against Bulgar and Arab invaders at a time when it was threatened by internal feuding and outright treason.

== Historical accuracy ==
Although Byzantium was at war with the Bulgars and Nicephorus did try to take the throne from Constantine, there is no record of a collusion between them which forms a part of the story. However, wherever the narrative thus enlarges upon the historical record this is explained in an afterword.

Likewise all historical personages referred to and all terms are explained in notes at the book's end. These may be unnecessarily extensive but the author assumes little knowledge of Byzantium on the part of modern readers.

== Fetishism ==
Beth is a virginal but titillating figure who comforts Constantine in his trials, her devil-may-care attitude is refreshing to him when she appears to the sleeping emperor in high heeled boots and leather fetishwear. Her appearances are a relief from the stultifying atmosphere of Constantine's court.

Although Beth's character is inspired by Page, her life is entirely a fiction. By the story's end she finds love in her own time. There is some depravity in the treatment of a Bulgar slave girl who is whipped and defiled by Nicephorus.

== See also ==
Paul Kastenellos's other novel set in the Byzantine Empire, about the life and loves of the wife of Belisarius.

- Antonina: A Byzantine Slut

== Sources ==
- The Chronicle of Theophanes. Harry Turtledove University of Pennsylvania Press. 1982.
- Rawlings, Sally. Byzantium At War AD 600 – 1453, Essential Histories. Osprey Publishing.
- Byzantium: The Imperial Centuries AD 610 – 1071. Reprinted by University of Toronto Press. 1966.
- Byzantine Empresses. Alfred A, Knoff publisher. 1927.
