= Procopius =

Byzantine historian (c. 500 – 565)

- Born: c. 500; Caesarea Maritima, Palaestina Prima, Byzantine Empire
- Died: c. 565; Constantinople, Byzantine Empire
- Occupations: Legal advisor, political commentator
- Writing career
- Subject: Secular history
- Notable works: History of the Wars; On Buildings; Secret History

Procopius of Caesarea (/proʊˈkoʊpiəs/; Ancient Greek: Προκόπιος ὁ Καισαρεύς Prokópios ho Kaisareús; Latin: Procopius Caesariensis; c. 500 – 565) was a prominent Greek scholar and historian from Caesarea in Palestine. Accompanying the Byzantine general Belisarius in Emperor Justinian's wars, Procopius became the principal historian of the 6th century, writing the History of the Wars, On Buildings, and the Secret History.

== Biography ==
=== Early life ===
Apart from his own writings, the main source for Procopius's life is an entry in the Suda, a Byzantine encyclopaedia written sometime after 975 which (based on older sources) discusses his early life. He was a native of Caesarea in Palestine. He would have received a conventional upper-class education in the Greek classics and rhetoric, perhaps at the school at Gaza. He may have attended law school, possibly at Berytus (present-day Beirut) or Constantinople (now Istanbul), (Note: For an alternative reading of Procopius as a trained engineer, see Howard-Johnson.) and became a lawyer (rhetor). He knew Latin, as was natural for a man with legal training. (Note: Procopius uses and translates a number of Latin words in his Wars. Börm suggests a possible acquaintance with Vergil and Sallust.)

=== Career ===
In 527, the first year of the reign of the emperor Justinian I, Procopius became the legal adviser (adsessor) for Belisarius, a general whom Justinian made his chief military commander in a great attempt to restore control over the lost western provinces of the empire. (Note: Procopius speaks of becoming Belisarius's advisor (symboulos) in that year.)

Procopius was with Belisarius on the eastern front until the latter was defeated at the Battle of Callinicum in 531 and recalled to Constantinople. Procopius witnessed the Nika riots of January 532, which Belisarius and his fellow general Mundus repressed with a massacre in the Hippodrome there. In 533, he accompanied Belisarius on his victorious expedition against the Vandal kingdom in North Africa, took part in the capture of Carthage, and remained in Africa with Belisarius's successor Solomon the Eunuch when Belisarius returned east to the capital. Procopius recorded a few of the extreme weather events of 535–536, although these were presented as a backdrop to Byzantine military activities, such as a mutiny in and around Carthage. (Note: Before modern times, European and Mediterranean historians, as far as weather is concerned, typically recorded only the extreme or major weather events for a year or a multi-year period, preferring to focus on the human activities of policymakers and warriors instead.) He rejoined Belisarius for his campaign against the Ostrogothic kingdom in Italy and experienced the Gothic siege of Rome that lasted a year and nine days, ending in mid-March 538. He witnessed Belisarius's entry into the Gothic capital, Ravenna, in 540. Both the Wars and the Secret History suggest that his relationship with Belisarius cooled thereafter. Perhaps he accompanied the general once more to the Persian front in 542. When Belisarius was sent back to Italy in 544 to cope with a renewal of the war with the Goths, now led by the able king Totila, Procopius appears to have no longer been on Belisarius's staff.

As magister militum, Belisarius was an "illustrious man" (Latin: vir illustris; Ancient Greek: ἰλλούστριος, illoústrios); being his adsessor, Procopius must therefore have had at least the rank of a "visible man" (vir spectabilis). He thus belonged to the mid-ranking group of the senatorial order (ordo senatorius). However, the Suda, which is usually well-informed in such matters, also describes Procopius himself as one of the illustres. Should this information be correct, Procopius would have had a seat in Constantinople's senate, which was restricted to the illustres under Justinian.

=== Death ===
It is not certain when Procopius died. Many historians—including Howard-Johnson, Cameron, and Geoffrey Greatrex—date his death to 554, but there was an urban prefect of Constantinople (praefectus urbi Constantinopolitanae) who was called Procopius in 562. In that year, Belisarius was implicated in a conspiracy and was brought before this urban prefect.

== Writings ==
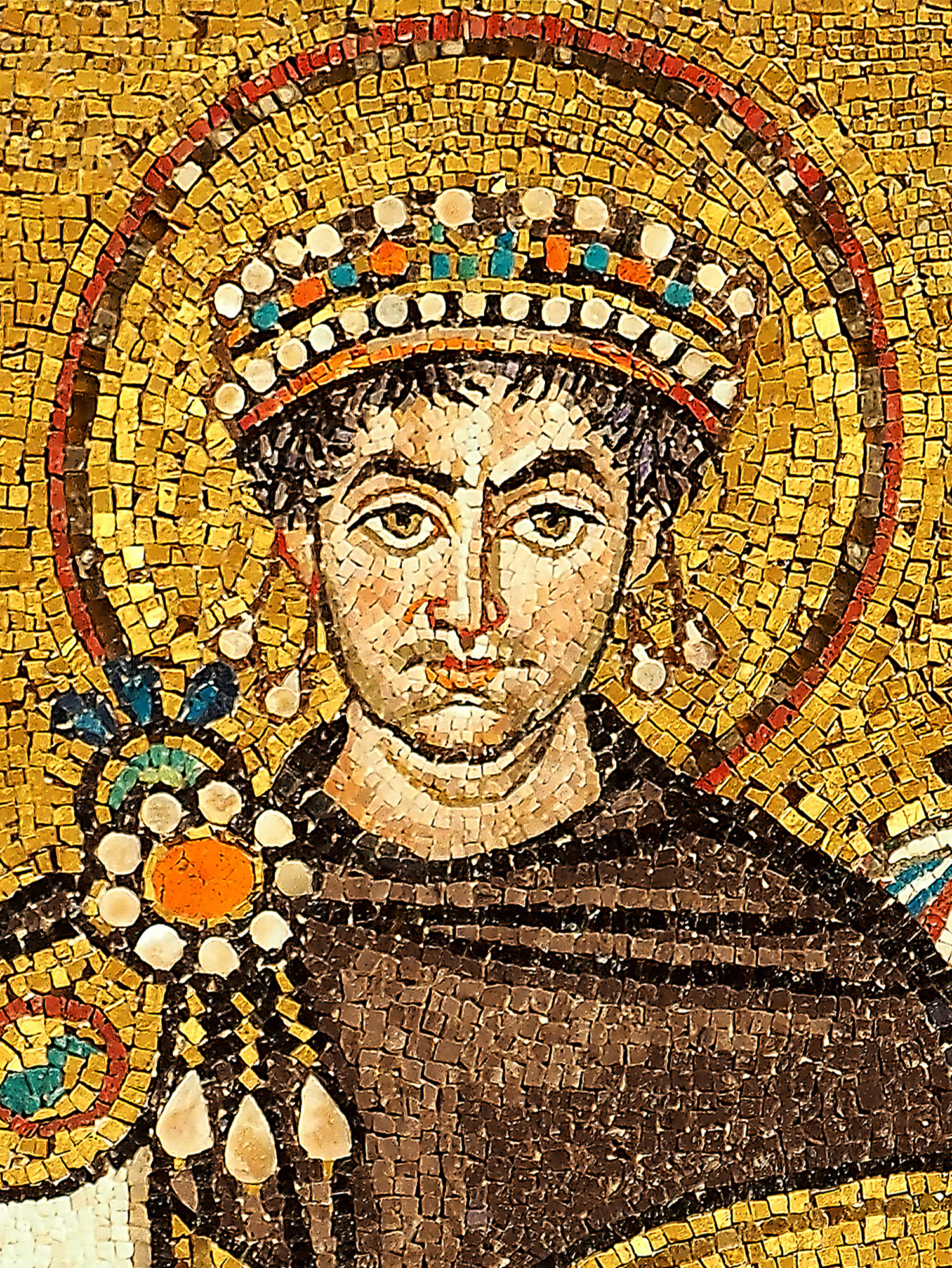
Sixth-century mosaic depicting Emperor Justinian

The writings of Procopius are the primary source of information for the rule of the emperor Justinian I. Procopius was the author of a history in eight books on the wars prosecuted by Justinian, a panegyric on the emperor's public works projects throughout the empire, and a book known as the Secret History that claims to report the scandals that Procopius could not include in his officially sanctioned history for fear of angering the emperor, his wife, Belisarius, and the general's wife Antonina.

=== History of the Wars ===
Procopius's Wars or History of the Wars (Ancient Greek: Ὑπὲρ τῶν Πολέμων Λόγοι, Hypèr tōn Polémon Lógoi, "Words on the Wars"; Latin: De Bellis, "On the Wars") is his most important work, although less well known than the Secret History. The first seven books seem to have been largely completed by 545 and may have been published as a set. They were, however, updated to mid-century before publication, with the latest mentioned event occurring in early 551. The eighth and final book brought the history to 553.

The first two books—often known as The Persian War (Latin: De Bello Persico)—deal with the conflict between the Byzantines and Sassanid Persia in Mesopotamia, Syria, Armenia, Lazica, and Iberia (present-day Georgia). It details the campaigns of the Sassanid shah Kavadh I, the 532 'Nika' revolt, the war by Kavadh's successor Khosrau I in 540, his destruction of Antioch and deportation of its inhabitants to Mesopotamia, and the great plague that devastated the empire from 542. The Persian War also covers the early career of Procopius's patron Belisarius in some detail.

The Wars’ next two books—known as The Vandal War or Vandalic War (Latin: De Bello Vandalico)—cover Belisarius's successful campaign against the Vandal kingdom that had occupied Rome's provinces in northwest Africa for the last century.

The final four books—known as The Gothic War (Latin: De Bello Gothico)—cover the Italian campaigns by Belisarius and others against the Ostrogoths. Procopius includes accounts of the 1st and 2nd sieges of Naples and the 1st, 2nd, and 3rd sieges of Rome. He also includes an account of the rise of the Franks (see Arborychoi). The last book describes the eunuch Narses's successful conclusion of the Italian campaign and includes some coverage of campaigns along the empire's eastern borders as well.

The War histories contain various longer excursions on different topics. These serve both literary and thematic purposes by providing the necessary background information as well as contextualising the acts of war described on different levels. The Wars proved influential on later Byzantine historiography. In the 570s Agathias wrote Histories, a continuation of Procopius's work in a similar style.

=== Secret History ===
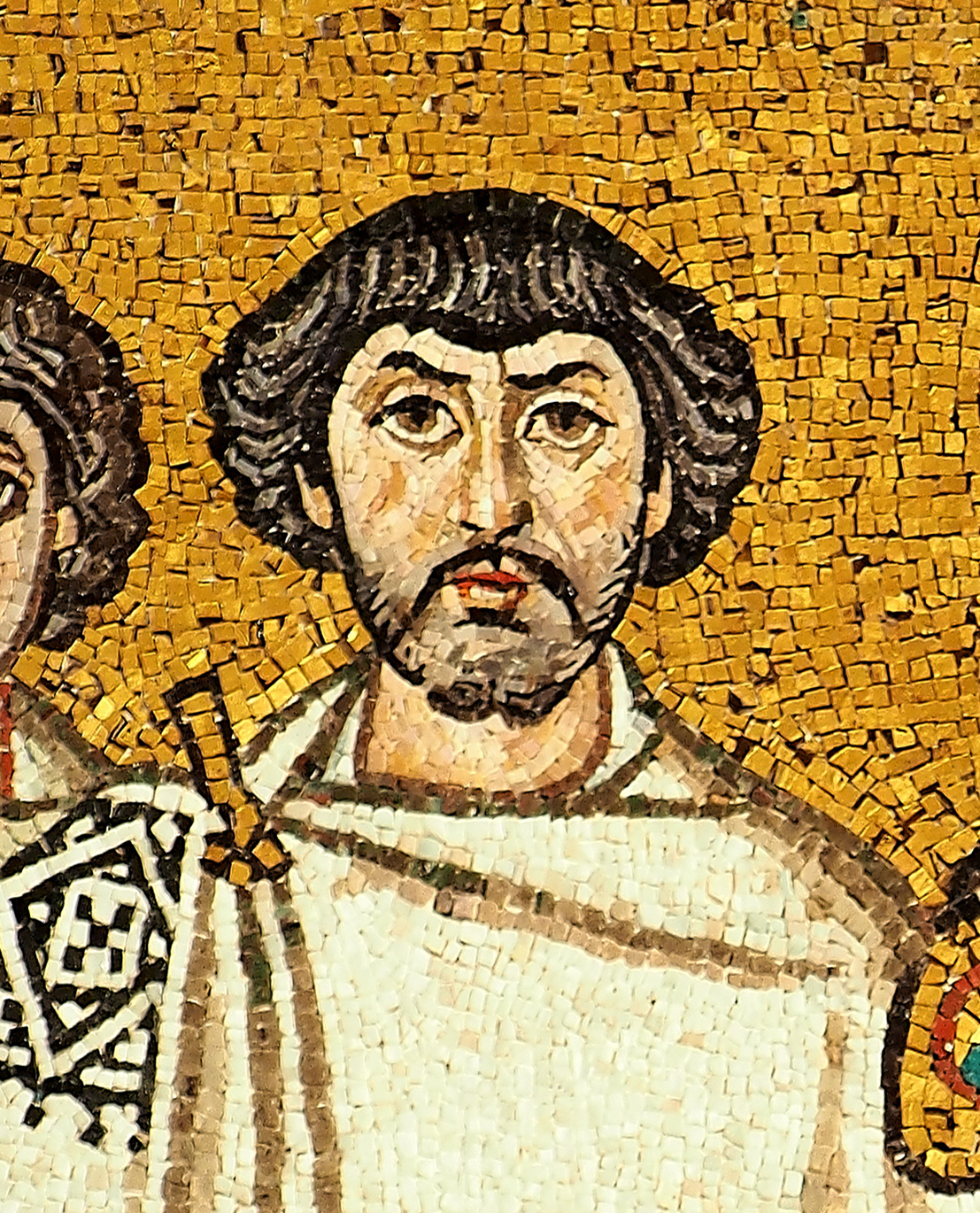
Sixth-century mosaic possibly depicting Belisarius in the Church of San Vitale, Ravenna, which celebrates the reconquest of Italy by the Byzantines

Procopius's now famous Anecdota, also known as the Secret History (Ancient Greek: Ἀπόκρυφη Ἱστορία, Apókryphe Historía; Latin: Historia Arcana), was discovered in 1623 in the Vatican Library in Rome by Niccolò Alamanni, who published it while omitting chapter 9 regarding the explicit material about the early years of Theodora and Justinian. Its existence was already known from Suda's encyclopedia (10th century), which referred to it as Procopius's "unpublished works" containing "comedy" and "criticism" of Justinian, Theodora, Belisarius and Antonina. The Secret History covers roughly the same years as the first seven books of The History of the Wars and appears to have been written after they were published. He wrote this book only after the death of Theodora as there were considerable risks to Procopius' life. Current consensus generally dates it to 550, or less commonly 558. In the preface Procopius wrote:

The reason for this decision is that I could not at that time give a candid report concerning certain events so long as the people who were responsible for them were still alive. It would have been impossible either to evade detection by the legions of their spies and informers or, having been caught, not to suffer a most cruel death. I could not even trust my closest relatives.

The Secret History claims to expose the private lives of Emperor Justinian and his wife Theodora, and the general Belisarius and his wife Antonina. Antony Kaldellis argues that the work exposes the tyrannical nature of the regime by demonstrating the subversion of public interest by the disordered private life of the emperor and his associates. Procopius fills the Secret History with scandalous reports about Justinian and his inner circle, communicating a deep hatred of Justinian's regime. In recent years, however, other scholars have warned against equating the account in the Secret History with Procopius's actual opinion. Justinian is portrayed as cruel, venal, prodigal, and incompetent. In one passage, it is even claimed that he was possessed by demonic spirits or was himself a demon lord:

And some of those who have been with Justinian at the palace late at night, men who were pure of spirit, have thought they saw a strange demoniac form taking his place. One man said that the Emperor suddenly rose from his throne and walked about, and indeed he was never wont to remain sitting for long, and immediately Justinian's head vanished, while the rest of his body seemed to ebb and flow; whereat the beholder stood aghast and fearful, wondering if his eyes were deceiving him. But presently he perceived the vanished head filling out and joining the body again as strangely as it had left it.

Similarly, the Theodora of the Secret History is a garish portrait of vulgarity and insatiable lust juxtaposed with cold-blooded self-interest, shrewishness, and envious and fearful mean-spiritedness. Throughout the Secret History, Procopius invokes Theodora's humble origins and criticizes her lack of moral virtue, reputation, and education. Among the more titillating revelations in the Secret History is Procopius's account of Theodora's thespian accomplishments:

Often, even in the theatre, in the sight of all the people, she removed her costume and stood nude in their midst, except for a girdle about the groin: not that she was abashed at revealing that, too, to the audience, but because there was a law against appearing altogether naked on the stage, without at least this much of a fig-leaf. Covered thus with a ribbon, she would sink to the stage floor and recline on her back. Slaves to whom the duty was entrusted would then scatter grains of barley from above into the calyx of this passion flower, whence geese, trained for the purpose, would next pick the grains one by one with their bills and eat.

Justinian and Theodora are portrayed as the antithesis of good rulers, with each representing the opposite side of the emotional spectrum. Justinian was approachable and kindly, even while ordering property confiscations or people's destruction. Conversely, Theodora was described as irrational and driven by her anger, often by minor affronts.

Furthermore, Secret History portrays Belisarius as a weak man completely emasculated by his wife, Antonina, who is portrayed in very similar terms to Theodora. They are both said to be former actresses (i.e., courtesans) and close friends. Procopius claimed Antonina worked as an agent for Theodora against Belisarius, and had an ongoing affair with Belisarius's godson, Theodosius.

=== On Buildings ===
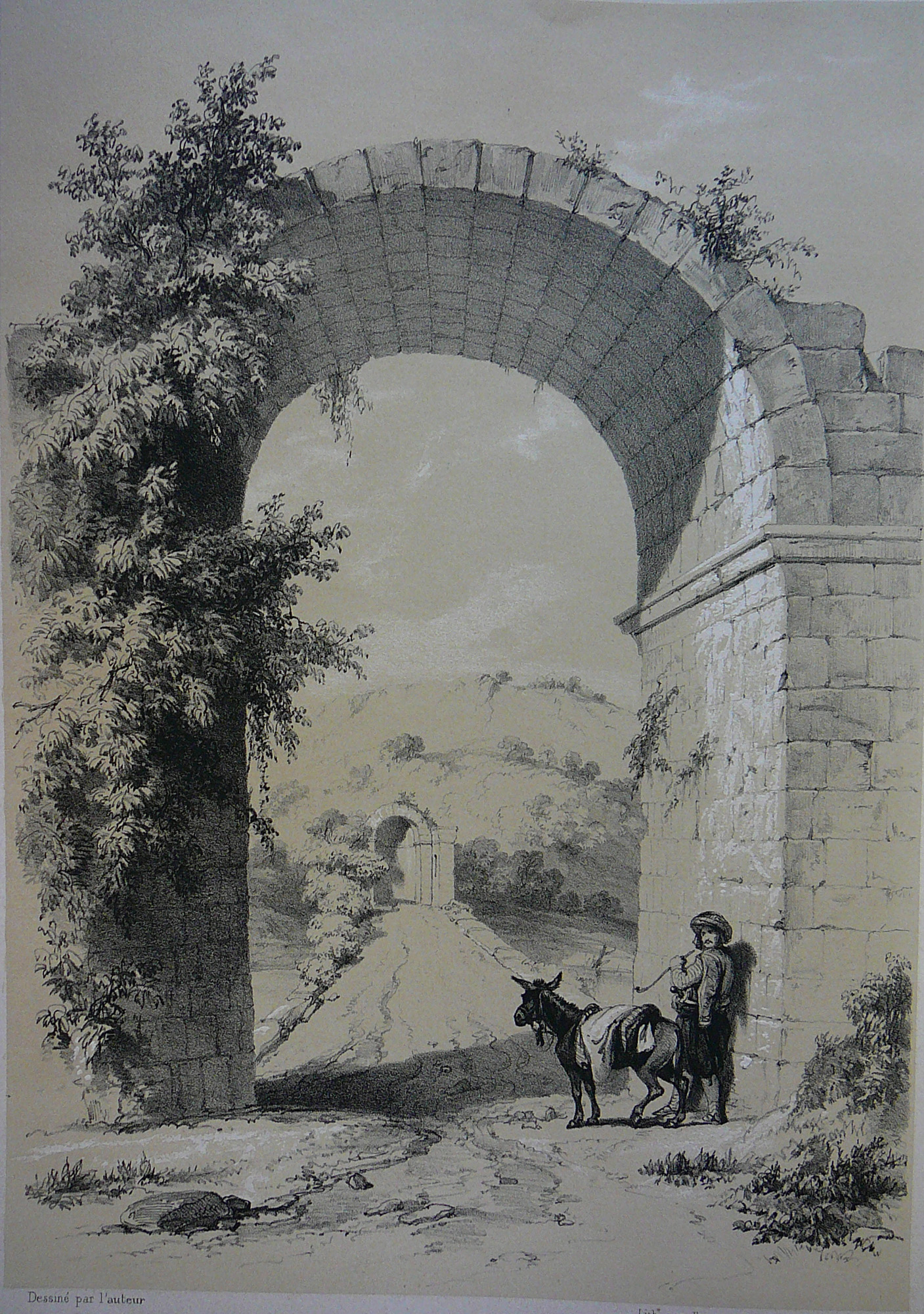
Triumphal arch at the entrance to the Sangarius Bridge

On Buildings (Ancient Greek: Περὶ Κτισμάτων, Perì Ktismáton; Latin: De Aedificiis) is a panegyric on Justinian's public works projects throughout the empire. The first book may date to before the collapse of the first dome of Hagia Sophia in 557, but some scholars think that it is possible that the work postdates the building of the bridge over the Sangarius in the late 550s. Historians consider On Buildings to be an incomplete work due to evidence of the surviving version being a draft with two possible redactions.

On Buildings was likely written at Justinian's behest, and it is doubtful that its sentiments expressed are sincere. It tells us nothing further about Belisarius, and it takes a sharply different attitude towards Justinian. He is presented as an idealised Christian emperor who built churches for the glory of God and defenses for the safety of his subjects. He is depicted showing particular concern for the water supply, building new aqueducts and restoring those that had fallen into disuse. Theodora, who was dead when this panegyric was written, is mentioned only briefly, but Procopius's praise of her beauty is fulsome.

Due to the panegyrical nature of Procopius's On Buildings, historians have discovered several discrepancies between claims made by Procopius and accounts in other primary sources. A prime example is Procopius's starting the reign of Justinian in 518, which was the start of the reign of his uncle and predecessor Justin I. By treating the uncle's reign as part of his nephew's, Procopius was able to credit Justinian with buildings erected or begun under Justin's administration. Such works include renovation of the walls of Edessa after its 525 flood and consecration of several churches in the region. Similarly, Procopius falsely credits Justinian for the extensive refortification of the cities of Tomis and Histria in Scythia Minor. This had been carried out under Anastasius I, who reigned before Justin.

== Scholarly assessment ==
=== Modern interpretations ===
Procopius is generally believed to be aligned with the senatorial ranks that disagreed with Justinian's tax policy (Secret History 12.12–14). Over time, Procopius's initial optimism may have been replaced by his disillusionment with Belisarius and increasing dislike of Justinian.

Henning Börm has argued that Procopius prepared the Secret History as an exaggerated document out of fear that a conspiracy might overthrow Justinian's regime, which—as a kind of court historian—might be reckoned to include him. The unpublished manuscript would then have been an insurance that could be offered to the new ruler as a way to avoid punishment. If this hypothesis is correct, the Secret History would not be proof that Procopius hated Justinian or Theodora.

Anthony Kaldellis suggests that the Secret History tells the dangers of "the rule of women". For Procopius, it was not that women could not lead an empire, but only women demonstrating masculine virtues could. According to Averil Cameron, the definition of "feminine" behavior in the sixth century would be described as "intriguing" and "interfering". At his core, Procopius wanted to preserve the social order. (Note: Henning Börm described this social order as a "social hierarchy: people stood over animals, freemen stood over slaves, men stood over eunuchs, and men stood over women. Whenever Procopius denounces the alleged breach of these rules, he is following the rules of historiography.")

Rene Pfeilschifter describes the Secret History as a literary invective, in which Procopius heavily distorts the lives of Justinian and his inner circle. However, Pfeilschifter argues that the Secret History is historically valuable as a unique example from the period of concern for the social order and hostility towards the reigning emperor expressed with such emphasis.

Averil Cameron makes a case that all of his works form a continuous, unified discourse, rather than being contradictory to one another. In her view, Procopius was a better reporter than a historian, whose strength lay in descriptions rather than analyses. She argues that his vision is too black-and-white and remains almost silent on theological and ecclesiastical debates. However, Shaun Tougher notes Procopius's intention to write an ecclesiastical history, which may have provided a more holistic picture of his time, and argues that Procopius should not be assessed as negatively.

=== Style ===
Procopius belongs to the school of late antique historians who continued the traditions of the Second Sophistic. Writing in Attic Greek, these historians relied on Classical writers such as Herodotus, Polybius and in particular Thucydides as their models and, similar to these, dealt with secular subjects. The Classically influenced historians avoided vocabulary unknown to Attic Greek, inserting an explanation when they had to use contemporary words. Thus Procopius includes glosses of monks ("the most temperate of Christians") and churches (as equivalent to a "temple" or "shrine"), since monasticism was unknown to the ancient Athenians and their ekklesía had been a popular assembly.

The secular historians eschewed the history of the Christian church. Ecclesiastical history was left to a separate genre after Eusebius. Cameron has argued that Procopius's works reflect the tensions between the classical and Christian models of history in 6th-century Constantinople. This has been supported by Whitby's analysis of Procopius's depiction of the capital and its cathedral in comparison to contemporary pagan panegyrics. Procopius can be seen as depicting Justinian as essentially God's vicegerent, making the case for buildings being a primarily religious panegyric. Procopius indicates that he planned to write an ecclesiastical history himself and, if he had, he would probably have followed the rules of that genre. As far as known, however, such an ecclesiastical history was never written.

Some historians have criticized Procopius's description of some barbarians, for example, he dehumanized the unfamiliar Moors as "not even properly human". This was, however, in line with Byzantine ethnographic practice in late antiquity.

== Legacy ==
A number of historical novels based on Procopius's works (along with other sources) have been written. Count Belisarius was written by poet and novelist Robert Graves in 1938. Procopius himself appears as a minor character in Felix Dahn's A Struggle for Rome and in L. Sprague de Camp's alternate history novel Lest Darkness Fall. The novel's main character, archaeologist Martin Padway, derives most of his knowledge of historical events from the Secret History.

The narrator in Herman Melville's novel Moby-Dick cites Procopius's description of a captured sea monster as evidence of the narrative's feasibility. A fictionalized version of Procopius, named Pertennius, appears in the fantasy novelist Guy Gavriel Kay's duology The Sarantine Mosaic.

== List of selected works ==
- J. Haury, ed. (1962–1964) [1905]. Procopii Caesariensis opera omnia (in Greek). Revised by G. Wirth. Leipzig: Teubner. "4 volumes"
- Dewing, H. B., ed. (1914–1940). Procopius. Loeb Classical Library. Cambridge, Massachusetts and London: Harvard University Press and Hutchinson. Seven volumes, Greek text and English translation.
  - Downey, G.; Dewing, Henry B., eds. (1940). Buildings of Justinian. Loeb Classical Library. Cambridge, Massachusetts: Harvard University Press.
- Procopius: The Secret History. Penguin Classics. Translated by Williamson, G. A. Revised by Peter Sarris. Harmondsworth: Penguin Books. 2007 [1966]. ISBN 978-0140455281. English translation of the Anecdota.
- Prokopios: The Secret History. Translated by Anthony Kaldellis. Indianapolis: Hackett. 2010. ISBN 978-1603841801.

== See also ==
- Jordanes
- Gregory of Tours

== Footnotes ==
=== Attribution ===
- This article is based on an earlier version by James Allan Evans, originally posted at Nupedia.

== Sources ==
=== Books ===
- Börm, Henning (2007). Prokop und die Perser. Untersuchungen zu den römisch-sasanidischen Kontakten in der ausgehenden Spätantike [Procopius and the Persians. Studies on the Roman-Sasanian contacts in late antiquity]. Stuttgart: Franz Steiner. ISBN 978-3-515-09052-0. (Review in English by G. Greatrex and Review in English by A. Kaldellis)
- Börm, Henning (2022). "Procopius and the East". In Meier, Mischa; Montinaro, Federico (eds.). A Companion to Procopius of Caesarea. Leiden: Brill. ISBN 978-3-89781-215-4.
- Brodka, Dariusz (2022). Prokop von Caesarea. Hildesheim: Olms.
- Cameron, Averil (1985). Procopius and the Sixth Century. London: Duckworth.
- Evans, James A. S. (1972). Procopius. New York: Twayne Publishers.
- Evans, James Allan (2002). The Empress Theodora. University of Texas Press. doi:10.7560/721050. ISBN 978-0-292-79895-3.
- Georgiou, Andriani (2019). "Empresses in Byzantine Society: Justifiably Angry or Simply Angry?". In Constantinou, Stavroula; Meyer, Mati (eds.). Emotions and Gender in Byzantine Culture. New Approaches to Byzantine History and Culture. Cham: Palgrave Macmillan. pp. 111–140. doi:10.1007/978-3-319-96038-8_5. ISBN 978-3-319-96037-1. S2CID 149788509.
- Kaldellis, Anthony (2004). Procopius of Caesarea: Tyranny, History and Philosophy at the End of Antiquity. Philadelphia: University of Pennsylvania Press. ISBN 978-0-8122-0241-0.
- Riemenschneider, Jakob (2024). Prokop und der soziale Kosmos der Historiographie: Exkurse, Diskurse und die römische Gesellschaft der Spätantike [Procopius and the social cosmos of historiography: digressions, discourses and Roman society in late antiquity]. Berlin/Boston: De Gruyter. doi:10.1515/9783111547640. ISBN 978-3-11-154686-5.
- Stewart, Michael (2020). Masculinity, Identity, and Power Politics in the Age of Justinian: A Study of Procopius. Amsterdam: Amsterdam University Press. ISBN 978-90-485-4025-9.
- Ziebuhr, Albrecht (2024). Die Exkurse im Geschichtswerk des Prokopios von Kaisareia: Literarische Tradition und spätantike Gegenwart in klassizistischer Historiographie [The digressions in the historical works of Prokopios of Kaisareia: literary tradition and the late antique present in classical historiography] (Thesis). Hermes Einzelschriften. Vol. 126. Stuttgart: Steiner. ISBN 9783515136709.
- Melville, Herman (1851). Moby-Dick, or, the Whale. Vol. c.1. London: Harper & Brothers. doi:10.5962/bhl.title.62077.
- de Camp, L. Sprague (1949). Lest Darkness Fall. Ballantine Books.
- Kaldellis, Anthony (2013). Ethnography after antiquity: foreign lands and peoples in Byzantine literature. Philadelphia: University of Pennsylvania Press. ISBN 978-0-8122-0840-5. OCLC 859162344.

=== Journals ===
- Cresci, Lia Raffaella (2001). "Procopio al confine tra due tradizioni storiografiche" [Procopius on the border between two historiographical traditions]. Rivista di Filologia e di Istruzione Classica. 129: 61–77.
- Croke, Brian; Crow, James (1983). "Procopius and Dara". The Journal of Roman Studies. 73: 143–159. doi:10.2307/300078. JSTOR 300078.
- Downey, Glanville (1947). "The Composition of Procopius, De Aedificiis". Transactions and Proceedings of the American Philological Association. 78: 171–183. doi:10.2307/283492. JSTOR 283492.
- Grau, Sergi; Febrer, Oriol (2020). "Procopius on Theodora: ancient and new biographical patterns". Byzantinische Zeitschrift. 113 (3): 769–788. doi:10.1515/bz-2020-0034. ISSN 1868-9027.
- Howard-Johnson, James (2002). "The Education and Expertise of Procopius". Antiquité Tardive. 10: 19–30. doi:10.1484/J.AT.2.300682.
- Tougher, Shaun (1996). "Cameron and Beyond: A. Cameron, Procopius and the Sixth Century". Histos. 1. doi:10.29173/histos158. ISSN 2046-5963.
- Whitby, Michael (2006). "Procopian Polemics: a review of A. Kaldellis Procopius of Caesarea. Tyranny, History, and Philosophy at the End of Antiquity". The Classical Review. 55: 648ff.
- Whitby, Mary (2000). "Procopius' Buildings Book I: A Panegyrical Perspective". Antiquité Tardive. 8: 45–57. doi:10.1484/J.AT.2.300684.

=== Magazines ===
- Mendelsohn, Daniel (2010). "God's Librarians". The New Yorker.
