= Henning Börm =

German historian of Graeco-Roman antiquity (born 1974)

Henning Börm (born 1974 in Flensburg) is a German historian.

Börm studied at the University of Kiel, where he passed his Staatsexamen in February 2002. From 2003 to 2004, he worked at the Seminar for Ancient History at the University of Münster, and from 2004 to 2008 at the Department of Classics at Kiel University as a research assistant. He received his doctorate there in 2006 with a thesis, supervised by Josef Wiesehöfer, on the late antique historian Procopius of Caesarea and Roman-Sasanian relations. In 2008, he became a research assistant at the University of Konstanz, and after completing his habilitation with a monograph on stasis during the Hellenistic period in 2018 he was accepted into the Heisenberg Programme of the German Research Foundation. He then taught as a substitute professor at Humboldt University Berlin and at the University of Tübingen. In 2019, he was a guest professor at the University of Innsbruck in Austria, and from 2020 to 2022, Börm was full professor of Ancient History at the University of Bochum. He has held the Chair of Ancient History at the University of Rostock since 2022; in 2024, he taught as a guest lecturer at the University of Toronto.

Börm’s research focuses on both Greek and Roman topics, specialising in particular in the history of the Mediterranean world in the Hellenistic period and Late Antiquity. In 2013 he published a textbook on the Fall of the Western Roman Empire. His main research interests are ancient monocracies, Greek historiography, Roman–Iranian relations, the history of the Sasanian Empire and civil wars in antiquity. Börm is an ordinary member of the German Archaeological Institute. He is a member of the advisory board of the journal Chiron and one of the editors of the series Studies in Ancient Civil War.

== Publications ==
Monographs

- Mordende Mitbürger. Stasis und Bürgerkrieg in griechischen Poleis des Hellenismus (= Historia-Einzelschriften. 258). Steiner, Stuttgart 2019, ISBN 978-3-515-12311-2.
- Westrom. Von Honorius bis Justinian. 2nd edition. Kohlhammer, Stuttgart 2018, ISBN 978-3-17-033216-4.
- Prokop und die Perser. Untersuchungen zu den römisch-sasanidischen Kontakten in der ausgehenden Spätantike (= Oriens et Occidens. 16). Steiner, Stuttgart 2007, ISBN 978-3-515-09052-0.

Edited volumes

- with Carsten Hjort Lange and Johannes Wienand: Ancient Cultures of Civil War. De Gruyter Brill, Boston/Berlin 2027, ISBN 978-3-111-33308-3.
- with Ulrich Gotter and Wolfgang Havener: A culture of civil war? Bellum civile and political communication in late Republican Rome. Steiner, Stuttgart 2023, ISBN 978-3-515-13401-9.
- with Nino Luraghi: The Polis in the Hellenistic World. Steiner, Stuttgart 2018, ISBN 978-3-515-12020-3.
- with Johannes Wienand and Marco Mattheis: Civil War in Ancient Greece and Rome. Contexts of Disintegration and Reintegration. Steiner, Stuttgart 2016, ISBN 978-3-515-11224-6.
- with Carsten Binder and Andreas Luther: Diwan. Studies in the History and Culture of the Ancient Near East and the Eastern Mediterranean. Wellem, Duisburg 2016, ISBN 978-3-941820-24-1.
- Antimonarchic Discourse in Antiquity. Steiner, Stuttgart 2015, ISBN 978-3-515-11095-2.
- with Josef Wiesehöfer: Commutatio et contentio. Studies in the Late Roman, Sasanian, and Early Islamic Near East. Wellem, Düsseldorf 2010, ISBN 978-3-941820-03-6.
- with Norbert Ehrhardt and Josef Wiesehöfer: Monumentum et instrumentum inscriptum. Beschriftete Objekte aus Kaiserzeit und Spätantike als historische Zeugnisse. Steiner, Stuttgart 2008, ISBN 978-3-515-09239-5.
