= Hans-Joachim Gehrke =

German historian of classical antiquity

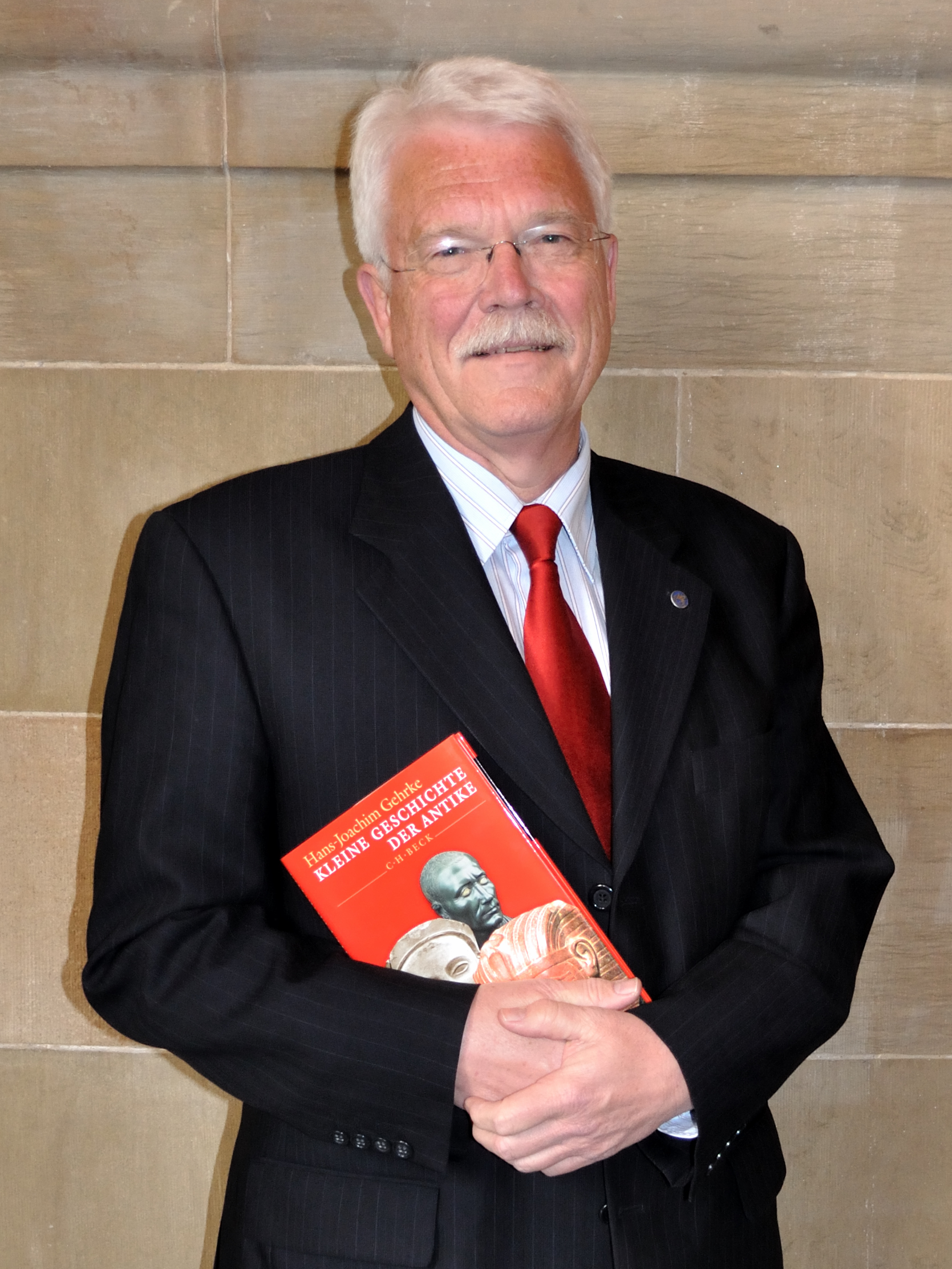
Hans-Joachim Gehrke

Hans-Joachim Gehrke, in full Hans-Joachim Günter Adolf Gehrke, (born October 28, 1945, in Salzgitter-Lebenstedt) is a German historian of ancient and classical antiquity. He was president of the German Archaeological Institute from 2008 to 2011.

== Life ==
Hans-Joachim Gehrke studied at the city-run Ratsgymnasium Goslar from 1961 to 1965 and passed his final exams there in 1965. He went on to study history and classical philology at the University of Göttingen from 1967 to 1973, where he received his doctorate in 1973 with a study on Phocion. Gehrke conducted research under the supervision of Alfred Heuß and later became his research assistant from 1973 to 1977. Subsequently, he collaborated with Heuß's successor Jochen Bleicken until he qualified for a professorship at Göttingen in 1982. The subject of his highly influential work published in 1985 was the phenomenon of Stasis in classical Greece, which Gehrke posited to be primarily the embodiment of rivalries among the noble classes.

From 1982 to 1984 Gehrke taught as an associate professor of ancient history at the University of Würzburg, then from 1984 to 1987 as a full professor at the Free University of Berlin. From 1987 to 2008, Gehrke held the chair of ancient history at the University of Freiburg. On July 11, 2007, Hans-Joachim Gehrke was elected president of the German Archaeological Institute, succeeding Hermann Parzinger in the position on March 1, 2008. In the same year, he was appointed honorary professor for the subjects of ancient history and classical philology at the Free University of Berlin. He retired in 2011 and his successor at the DAI has been Friederike Fless since April 1, 2011.

Since 2011 Gehrke has been the director for foreign relations at the "University College Freiburg" (UFC), an institution of the University of Freiburg. Hans-Joachim Gehrke is also a corresponding member of the "Academy of Non-Profit Sciences at Erfurt" and a full member of the Heidelberg Academy of Sciences and Humanities. In 2009 he was elected as a member of the Academia Europaea. Since 2010 he has also been a member of the German National Academy of Sciences Leopoldina. From 1999 to 2005 he was a member of the senate, the board of trustees, and the main committee of the German Research Foundation. He also is active in the "Gerda Henkel Foundation", initially as a member and director of the scientific advisory board and since 2005 as a member of the board of trustees. In 2010 Gehrke was endowed with the Order of Merit of the Federal Republic of Germany on the ribbon. In 2012 the University of Cologne awarded him the honorary doctorate at their philosophical faculty. 2017 Gehrke was granted the Ausonius Award of the University of Trier.

Gehrke's research focus lies on the history of Greek antiquity, the historical regional study of the central and eastern Mediterranean, the social conflicts and the social integration, the intercultural relationships as well as on ideas about history and collective identities.

Among his academic pupils are Ulrich Gotter, Christian Mann, Peter Franz Mittag, Astrid Möller, Kai Trampedach, Gregor Weber, Michael Sommer, Eckhard Wirbelauer and Felix K. Maier.

== Works ==
- Phokion. Studien zur Erfassung seiner historischen Gestalt [Phocion. Studies on the understanding of his historical character] (= Zetemata. Vol. 64). C. H. Beck, München 1976, ISBN 3-406-05154-5 (= dissertation, University of Göttingen 1973).
- Stasis. Untersuchungen zu den inneren Kriegen in den griechischen Staaten des 5. und 4. Jahrhunderts v. Chr. [Stasis. Studies on the internal wars in the Greek states of the 5th and 4th centuries BC.] (= Vestigia. Vol. 35). C. H. Beck, München 1985, ISBN 3-406-08065-0 (= habilitation thesis, University of Göttingen 1981).
- Jenseits von Athen und Sparta. Das dritte Griechenland und seine Staatenwelt [Beyond Athens and Sparta. The third Greece and its world of states] C. H. Beck, München 1986, ISBN 3-406-31537-2.
- Geschichte des Hellenismus [History of the Hellenistic Period] (= Oldenbourg Grundriss der Geschichte. Vol. 1A). Oldenbourg, München 1990, ISBN 3-486-53051-8
  - in greek translation: Ιστορία του ελληνιστικού κόσμου. Μορφωτικό Ίδρυμα Εθνικής Τραπέζης, Αθήνα 2000, ISBN 960-250-202-9.
- Alexander der Große [Alexander the Great] (= Beck’sche Reihe. Vol. 2043, C. H. Beck Wissen). C. H. Beck, München 1996, ISBN 3-406-41043-X.
  - in spanish translation: Alejandro Magno (= Flashback. Vol. 1). Acento, Madrid 2001, ISBN 84-483-0558-2.
  - in czech translation: Alexander Veliký. Svoboda, Prag 2002, ISBN 80-205-1034-6.
- Kleine Geschichte der Antike [Short History of Antiquity]. C. H. Beck, München 1999, ISBN 3-406-45530-1; Deutscher Taschenbuch-Verlag, München 2003 (= dtv. Vol. 34041), ISBN 3-423-34041-X.
- with Helmuth Schneider (Hrsg.): Geschichte der Antike. Ein Studienbuch [History of Antiquity. A study book]. J. B. Metzler, Stuttgart/Weimar 2000, ISBN 3-476-01455-X; 5th edition, 2019, ISBN 978-3-476-04760-1.
- Geschichte als Element antiker Kultur. Die Griechen und ihre Geschichte(n) [History as Element of Ancient Culture. The Greeks and their (hi)story]. De Gruyter, Berlin 2014, ISBN 978-3-11-035050-0.
- Ausgewählte Schriften [Selected papers]. Edited by Kai Trampedach and Christian Mann.
  - Volume 1: Politik und politisches Denken [Politics and Political Thought]. Franz Steiner Verlag, Stuttgart 2019, ISBN 978-3-515-12356-3 (Table of content).
  - Volume 2: Hellenismus [Hellenism]. Franz Steiner Verlag, Stuttgart 2021, ISBN 978-3-515-12951-0 (Table of content)
  - Volume 3: Historiographie, intentionale Geschichte und kollektive Identitäten [Historiography, Intentional History and Collective Identities]. Franz Steiner Verlag, Stuttgart 2022, ISBN 978-3-515-13290-9 (Table of content)
  - Volume 4: Historische Landeskunde und Geographie [Historical Landscape History and Geography]. Franz Steiner Verlag, Stuttgart 2024, ISBN 978-3-515-13771-3.
