= Niccolò Alemanni =

Roman antiquarian of Greek origin (1583-1626)

Niccolò Alemanni (Ancona, 12 January 1583 – Rome, 1626) was a Roman antiquarian of Greek origin.

== Biography ==
Alemanni was educated in Rome at the Greek College, founded by Gregory XIII, but was ordained deacon and priest according to the Latin rite.

After teaching Greek for some time to persons of rank, he was appointed secretary to Cardinal Borghese, and afterwards made custodian of the Vatican Library. His death is said to have been caused by too close attendance at the erection of the high altar of St. Peter's, to which honorable duty he had been assigned with orders to see that the sepulchres of the holy martyrs were not interfered with in the course of the work.

== Works ==
Alemanni wrote a Syntagma de Lateranensibus parietibus (Rome, 1625) on the occasion of restorations carried out in the church of St. John Lateran by his patron, Cardinal Borghese; also a dissertation on the relative importance of the right and left side as exhibited in certain old papal coins that place St. Paul to the right of St. Peter, De dextrae laevaeque manus praerogativa ex antiquis Pontificum nummis Paulum Petro apostolo anteponentibus. He is known in the history of classical literature as the editor (Lyon, 1623) of the famous Anecdota, or Secret History, of Procopius (call number VAT.Gr.1001), a work that was violently criticized outside of Italy.
