= Nino Luraghi =

Italian historian of ancient Greece (born 1964)

Nino Luraghi (born 30 November 1964) is an Italian historian of ancient Greece, who holds the Wykeham Professorship of Ancient History at Oxford University.

== Life ==
Luraghi is the son of Raimondo Luraghi (1921–2012), an Italian resistance fighter and historian. He studied at the universities of Venice and Rome, where he received his doctorate in 1992 with a thesis on archaic tyrannies.

From 1995 to 1997 he was an Alexander von Humboldt Fellow at the University of Freiburg, and continued until 1999 as a research assistant. Concurrently he was assistant professor of ancient history at the University of Parma from 1997 to 1999. From 1999 to 2003 Luraghi was assistant professor of the classics at Harvard University; from 2003 to 2004 he was associate professor of ancient history at the University of Toronto; and in 2005 he returned to Harvard as professor of the classics, having declined a professorship at the University of Konstanz. In 2008 he moved to Princeton University where in 2009 he became David Magie '97 Class of 1897 Professor of Classics. In 2018 Oxford University appointed him to the Wykeham Professorship of Ancient History.

Luraghi specializes in Greek history of the Classical and Hellenistic periods. His research focuses primarily on the history of Athens and Messenia, ancient historiography, and Greek tyranny.

== Publications (selection) ==
Author

- Tirannidi arcaiche in Sicilia e Magna Grecia [Archaic tyrannies in Sicily and Greater Greece]. Florence, 1994.
- The Ancient Messenians: Constructions of Ethnicity and Memory. Cambridge, 2008.

Editor

- The Historian's Craft in the Age of Herodotus. Oxford, 2001.
- Formen römischer Geschichtsschreibung von den Anfängen bis Livius [Forms of Roman historiography from the beginning to Livy]. Darmstadt, 2003.
- (with Susan E. Alcock) Helots and their Masters at Laconia and Messenia: Histories, Ideologies, Structures. Cambridge (Ma.), 2003.
- The Politics of Ethnicity and the Crisis of the Peloponnesian League. Cambridge (Ma.), 2009.
- (with Hans-Joachim Gehrke) Intentional History: Spinning Time. Stuttgart, 2010.
- The Splendors and Miseries of Ruling Alone. Stuttgart, 2013
- (with Henning Börm) The Polis in the Hellenistic World. Stuttgart, 2018.
