= Attidius (senator) =

Roman senator (fl. 1st century BC)

Attidius (fl. 1st century BC), possibly to be identified with Marcus Atilius Bulbus, was a senator of the Roman Republic. Sometime in the early 70s BC, he was convicted of a crime, probably maiestas, and exiled. Attidius found refuge in the court of Mithridates VI of Pontus, and the two men were friends for many years. The sole evidence for Attidius's life and career is a passage by the Greek historian Appian in his Mithridatic Wars.

Around 67 BC, during the Third Mithridatic War, Attidius joined a conspiracy to assassinate Mithridates. The plot was discovered, and the Pontic king put him to death. In recognition of his rank, Mithridates forbade his torture. The other conspirators suffered protracted torture, but the freedmen attached to Attidius were granted clemency by the king, because they were judged to have acted out of obligation to their patron.

== Attidius or Atilius? ==
The friend of Mithridates is the only senator known to have the nomen Attidius during the Republic, and since other names in Appian are problematic, his Ἀττίδιος has been read also as Attilius. It has been argued that "Attidius" could in fact be Marcus Atilius Bulbus, a corrupt juryman who, according to Cicero, accepted bribes in the trial of Statius Albius Oppianicus in 74 BC. Atilius Bulbus was himself put on trial sometime between 74 and 70 BC and charged under the Lex Cornelia de maiestate, a capital crime, for attempting to incite the legion commanded by Gaius Cosconius in Illyria. Except during proscriptions and civil wars, the Romans of the Republic preferred the punishment of exile to execution for men of rank.

It has been conjectured that the military efforts of Atilius in Illyria were on behalf of either Aemilius Lepidus, who along with Marcus Brutus (consul 77 BC) attempted to resist the senatorial oligarchy, or Quintus Sertorius and his Hispanian government in exile. If Atilius is to be identified with Attidius, a Sertorian connection could explain how the exile ended up in the court of Mithridates, but this reconstruction of events is "highly speculative".

Atilius Bulbus came from "one of the most famous houses of the plebeian nobility, now in decay and showing no more consuls." Ronald Syme suggested that he might be a descendant of the M. Atilius Bulbus who was consul in 245 and 235 BC. Cato, the brother-in-law of Marcus Brutus, married an Atilia, indicating ties between the Bruti and Atilii that might point toward Bulbus's motives in Illyria.

== Selected bibliography ==
=== Primary source ===
- Appian, Mithridatic Wars 90.

=== Secondary sources ===
- Alexander, Michael C. Trials in the Late Roman Republic, 149 BC to 50 BC. University of Toronto Press, 1990.
- Gruen, Erich S. The Last Generation of the Roman Republic. University of California Press, 1974, 1995.
- Kelly, Gordon P. A History of Exile in the Roman Republic. Cambridge University Press, 2006, pp. 187–188 online.
- Syme, Ronald. "Rome and the Balkans, 80 BC–AD 14." In The Provincial at Rome. University of Exeter Press, 1999.
