= Vincent O'Reilly =

American novelist

- Born: May 24, 1938 (Aged 82); Queens, New York, United States
- Occupations: Novelist, news librarian, reporter
- Writing career
- Pen name: Paul Kastenellos
- Notable works: Count No Man Happy: A Byzantine Fantasy, Antonina: A Byzantine Slut

Paul Kastenellos is a nom de plume of Vincent O'Reilly, the author of two novels of the Byzantine Empire: Antonina: A Byzantine Slut about the maligned wife of the famed sixth century Roman general Flavius Belisarius, and Count No Man Happy: A Byzantine Fantasy, which recounts the sad life of the Emperor Constantine VI who was blinded by his own mother in the eighth century.

== Background ==
Before publishing, Kastenellos was briefly a newsman and then a news archivist for forty years, creating and maintaining a system to catalog news films and tapes. His concise style reflects his years of writing and abstracting and a reluctance to stereotype either contemporary or historical figures as simply good or evil.

He also studied the medieval Byzantine Empire, a passion from his college years in the nineteen-fifties. The Byzantine Empire was the continuation of the Roman in the east after the western part of the empire was dismembered by barbarian invaders: particularly Vandals, Franks, and Goths. As such it continued to rule from the Balkans, Greece, and modern Turkey, to the Holy Land and Egypt. His interest in the Byzantines was revived after visiting Constantinople and Turkey, Greece, and Italy during the '80s and '90s and he decided to devote himself to clearing the name of Antonina and bringing to the attention of modern readers of fiction the history and sophistication of this neglected successor state of Rome. In 2012, he published a fictionalized biography of Antonina entitled Antonina: A Byzantine Slut.

More recently Kastenellos has published a series of non fiction essays most of which he had also contributed to the now defunct Byzantine Times. Though written for a popular audience a number of them address some relatively obscure aspects of Byzantine history and culture. Specifically he details the later Roman Empire of the East's relations with the Empire of Aksum which spanned the Red Sea (Probably the source of the gold, frankincense, and myrrh brought to the infant Jesus by the three magi). He summarizes the Byzantine poem Digenes Akrites usually known more by reputation than first hand and details the still somewhat Byzantine village of Olymbos on the island of Karpathos. He writes appreciably of the 19th century historian Thomas Hodgkin who wrote of the age of Belisarius in Italy, of sea power, of medicine, Dualist theology in the empire, and the chain that protected Constantinople's Golden Horn.

== Influences ==
- Diehl, Charles (1963). Byzantine Empresses. Knopf.
- Pirenne, Henri (1937). Economic and Social History of Medieval Europe. Harvest Books.
- Bury, J.B. (1958). History of the later Roman Empire. Dover Publications.
