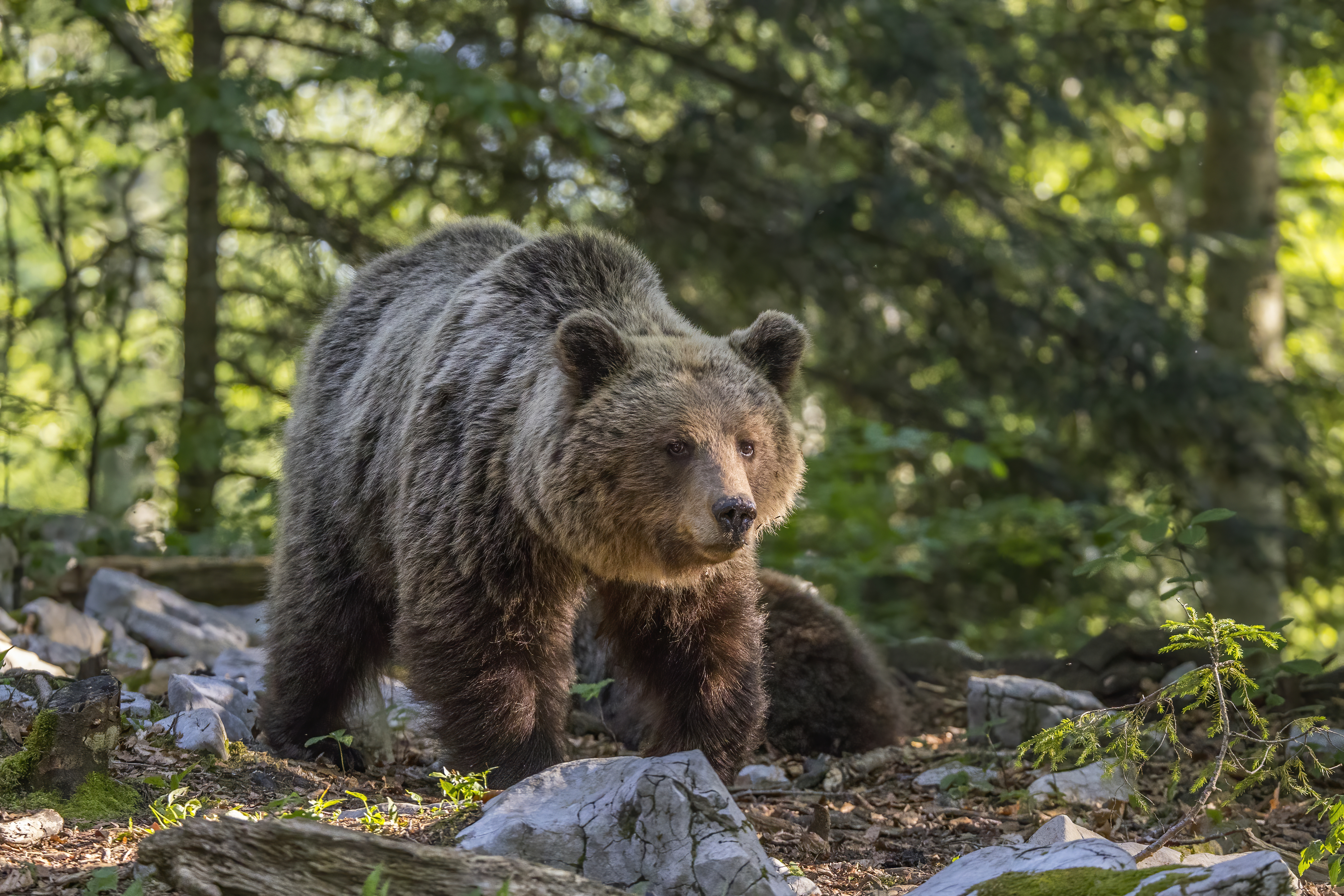
- An adult female in Slovenia

Conservation status
- Least Concern (IUCN 3.1)

Scientific classification
- Kingdom: Animalia
- Phylum: Chordata
- Class: Mammalia
- Order: Carnivora
- Family: Ursidae
- Genus: Ursus
- Species: U. arctos
- Subspecies: U. a. arctos

Trinomial name
- Ursus arctos arctos Linnaeus, 1758

= Eurasian brown bear =

Subspecies of carnivore

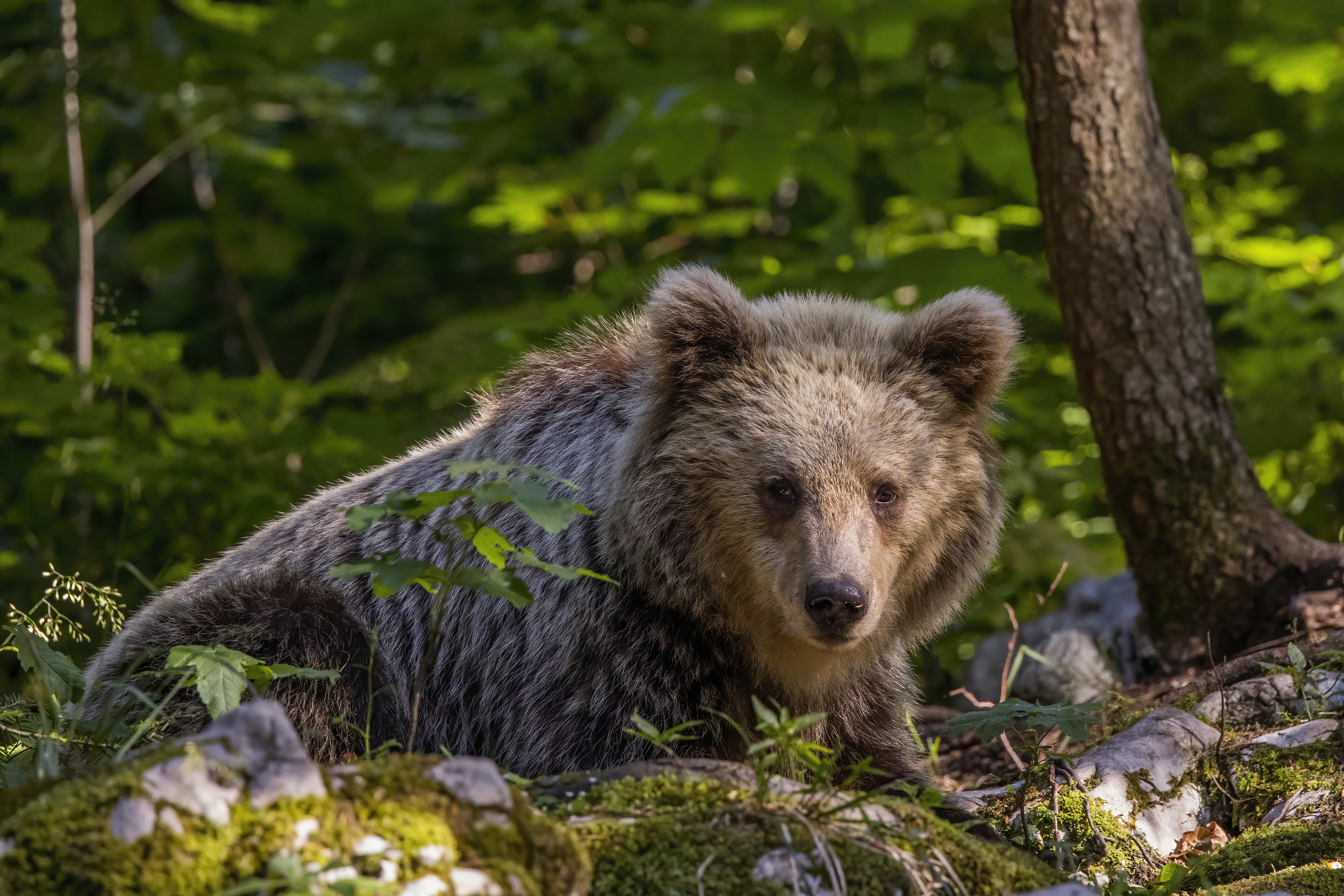
A young adult female.

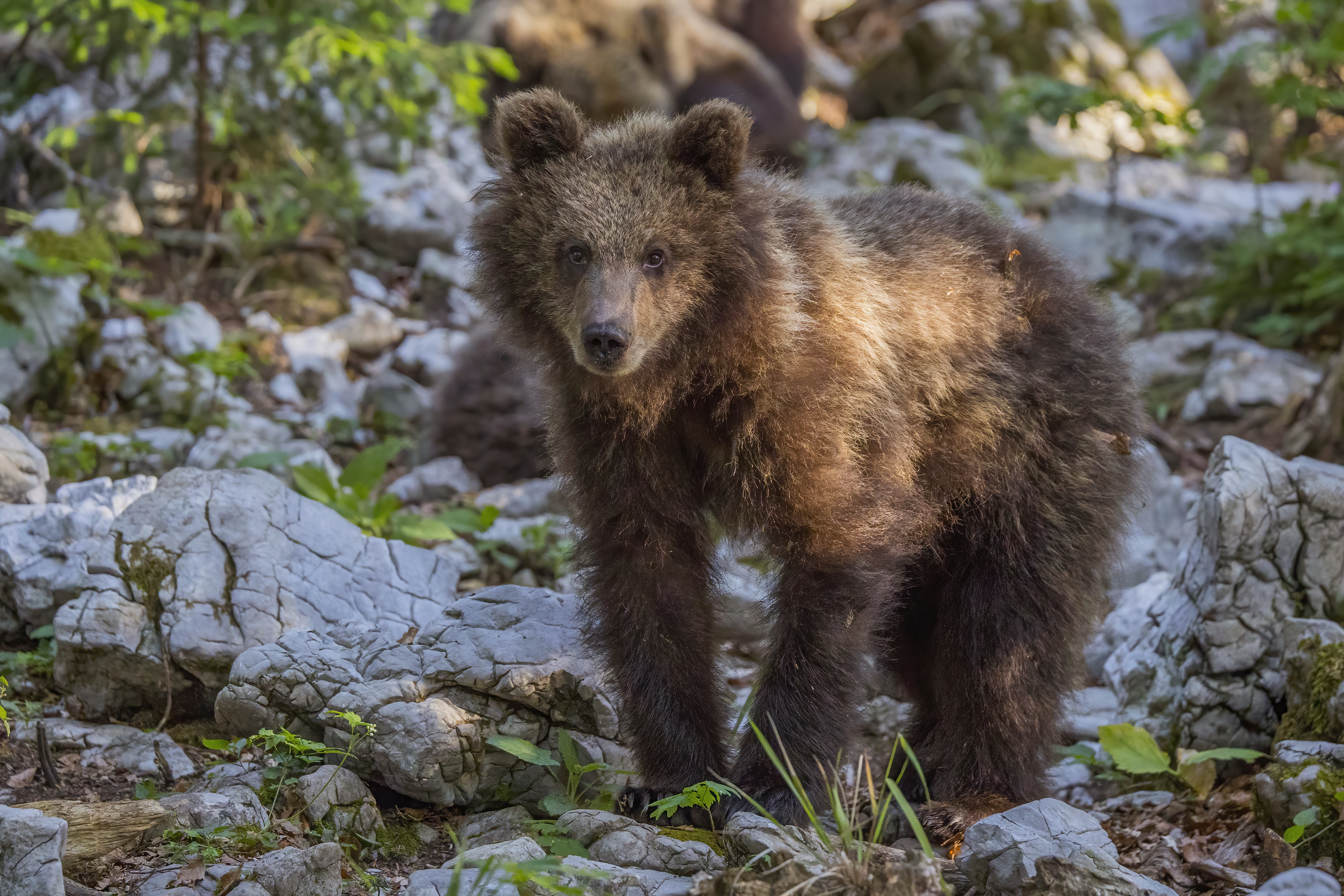
Cub, 14 months old.

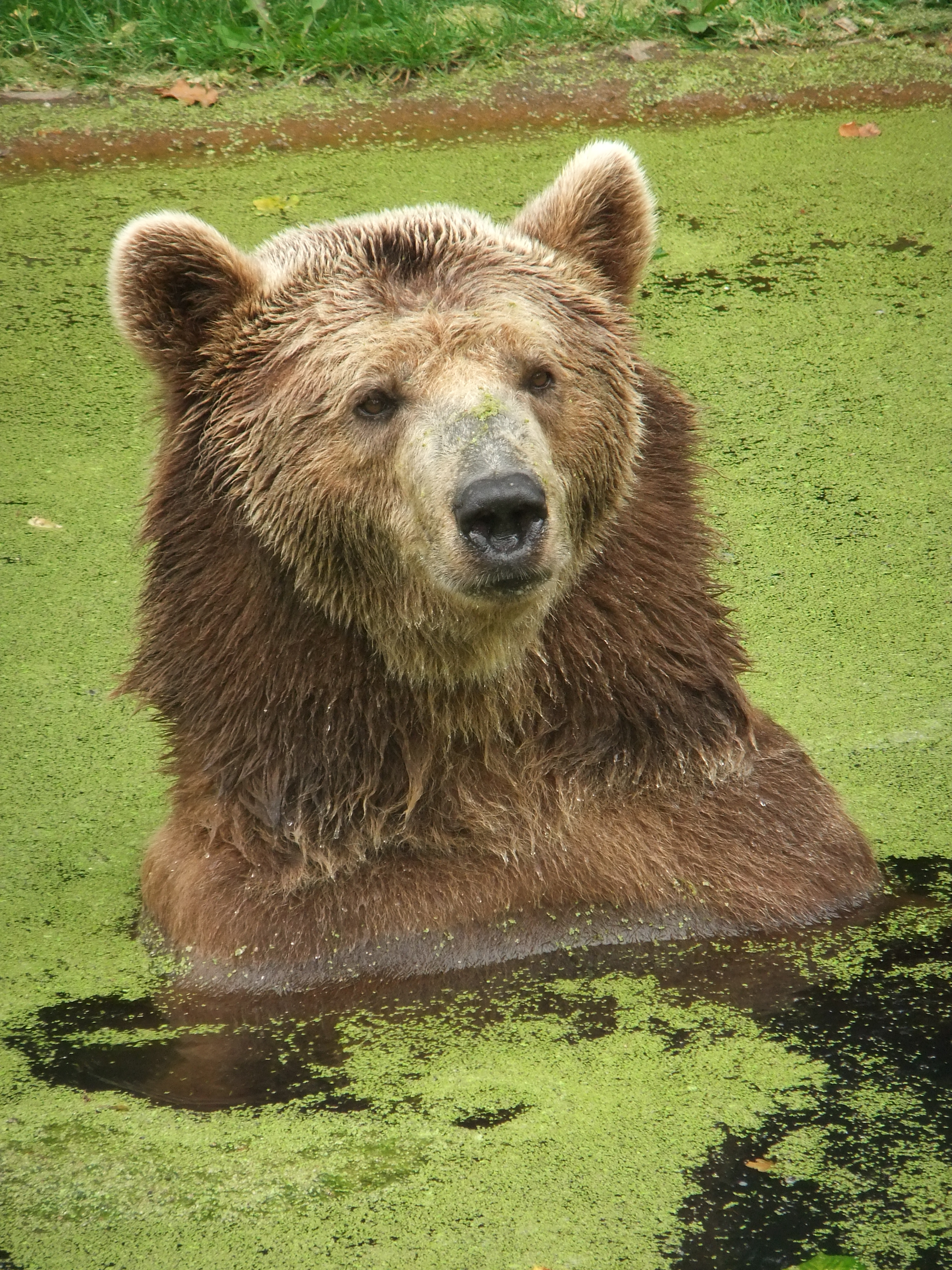
A Eurasian brown bear in a pond.

The Eurasian brown bear (Ursus arctos arctos) is one of the most common subspecies of the brown bear, and is found in much of Eurasia. It is also called the European brown bear, common brown bear, common bear, European bear, and colloquially by many other names. The genetic diversity of present-day brown bears (Ursus arctos) has been extensively studied over the years and appears to be geographically structured into five main clades based upon analysis of the mtDNA.

== Description ==
The Eurasian brown bear has brown fur, which ranges from yellowish-brown to dark brown, red-brown, and almost black in some cases; albinism has also been recorded. The fur is dense to varying degrees and the hair can grow up to 10 cm (3.9 in) in length. The head normally is quite round and has relatively small rounded ears, a wide skull, and a mouth equipped with 42 teeth, including predatory teeth. It has a powerful bone structure and large paws equipped with claws that can grow up to 10 cm (3.9 in) in length. The weight varies depending on habitat and the time of the year. A full-grown male weighs on average between 350 and 500 kg and reaches a maximum weight of 650 kg and length of nearly 2.5 m (8.2 ft). Females typically range between 150 and 300 kg and reach a maximum weight of 450 kg . They have a lifespan of 20 to 30 years in the wild.

== History ==
Eurasian brown bears were used in Ancient Rome for fighting in arenas. The strongest bears apparently came from Caledonia and Dalmatia.

In antiquity, the Eurasian brown bear was largely carnivorous, with 80% of its diet consisting of animal matter. However, as its habitat increasingly diminished, the portion of meat in its diet decreased with it until by the late Middle Ages, meat consisted of only 40% of its dietary intake. Today, meat makes up little more than 10–15% of its diet. Whenever possible, the brown bear will consume sheep.

Unlike in North America, where an average of two people a year are killed by bears, Scandinavia only has records of three fatal bear attacks within the last century. In late 2019, brown bears killed three men in Romania in just over a month.

It was named Ursus arctos arctos by Linnaeus in 1758, but has been given many synonyms including Ursus ursus Boddaert, 1772; Ursus badius Schrank, 1798; Ursus fuscus Tiedemann, 1808; Ursus alpinus G. Fischer von Waldheim, 1814; Ursus formicarius Billberg, 1828; Ursus pyrenaicus J. B. Fischer, 1829; Ursus norvegicus J. B. Fischer, 1829; Ursus falciger Reichenbach, 1836; Ursus cadaverinus Eversmann, 1840; Ursus longirostris Eversmann, 1840; Ursus euryrhinus Nilsson, 1847; Ursus normalis Gray, 1864; Myrmarctos eversmanni J. E. Gray, 1864; and many subspecies of Ursus arctos.

== Species origin ==
The oldest fossils are from the Choukoutien, China, and date back about 500,000 years. It is known from mtDNA studies that during the Pleistocene ice age it was too cold for the brown bear to survive in Europe except in three places: Russia, Spain, and the Balkans. However, a newer study found that brown bears were present in France and Belgium during the Last Glacial Maximum as well, indicating they were not as restricted to southern refugia as previously thought.

Modern research has made it possible to track the origin of the subspecies. The species to which it belongs developed more than 500,000 years ago, and researchers have found that the Eurasian brown bear separated about 850,000 years ago, with one branch based in Western Europe and the other branch in Russia, Eastern Europe and Asia. Through the research of mitochondrial DNA (mtDNA), researchers have found that the European family has divided into two clades—one in the Iberian Peninsula and the Balkans, the other in Russia.

There is a population in Scandinavia that includes bears of the western and eastern lineages. By analyzing the mtDNA of the southern population, researchers have found that they have probably come from populations in the Pyrenees in Southern France and Spain and the Cantabrian Mountains (Spain). Bears from these populations spread to southern Scandinavia after the last ice age. The northern bear populations originate in the Finnish/Russian population. Probably their ancestors survived the ice age in the ice-free areas west of the Ural Mountains, and thereafter spread to Northern Europe.

== Distribution ==
Brown bears could once be found across most of Eurasia, compared to the more limited range today. General habitats included areas such as grassland, sparsely vegetated land, and wetlands.

Although included as of Least Concern on the 2006 IUCN Red List of Threatened Species (which refers to the global species, not to the Eurasian brown bear specifically), local populations, specifically those in the European Union, are becoming increasingly scarce. As the IUCN itself adds: "Least Concern does not always mean that species are not at risk. There are declining species that are evaluated as Least Concern."

The brown bear has long been extinct in Britain (at least 1,500 years ago, possibly even 3,000 years ago), Denmark (about 6,500 years ago), the Netherlands (about 1,000 years ago, although later singles rarely wandered from Germany), Belgium and Luxembourg, with more recent extinctions in Germany (in the year 1835, although singles wandering from Italy were recorded in 2006 and 2019), Switzerland (in 1904, although a single was seen in 1923 and since 2005 there has been an increasing number of sightings of wanderers from Italy), and Portugal (in 1843, although a wanderer from Spain was recorded in 2019).

Globally, the largest population is found east of the Ural mountain range, in the large Siberian forests; brown bears are also present in smaller numbers in parts of central Asia.

The largest brown bear population in Europe is in Russia, where it has now recovered from an all-time low caused by intensive hunting. Populations in Baltoscandia are similarly, albeit slowly, increasing. They include almost 3,000 bears in Sweden, 2,000 in Finland, 1,400 in Estonia and around 100 in Norway.

Large populations can also be found in Romania (around 13,000), Slovakia (around 2,500), Bosnia and Herzegovina, Croatia (1,200), Slovenia (1,100), North Macedonia, Bulgaria, Poland, Turkey (around 4,000), and Georgia.

Small but still significant populations can also be found in Greece (around 870), Albania, Serbia and Montenegro. In 2005, there were an estimated 200 in Ukraine; these populations are part of two distinct metapopulations: the Carpathian with over 5000 individuals, and the Dinaric-Pindos (Balkans) with around 3000 individuals.

There is a small but growing population (at least 70 bears) in the Pyrenees, on the border between Spain and France, which was once on the edge of extinction, as well as two subpopulations in the Cantabrian Mountains in Spain (amounting to around 250 individuals). There are also populations totalling around 100 bears in the Abruzzo, South Tyrol and Trentino regions of Italy. Bears from the aforementioned Italian regions occasionally cross over to bordering Switzerland, which has not hosted a native population since its last bear was shot and killed in Graubünden in 1904.

Outside Europe and Russia/the CIS, other related clades of brown bears persist in smaller, isolated, and for the most part highly threatened populations in Iran, Afghanistan, Pakistan, North India, central Asia, Turkey, Northern Iraq, China, and on the island of Hokkaido in Japan.

== Cultural depictions ==
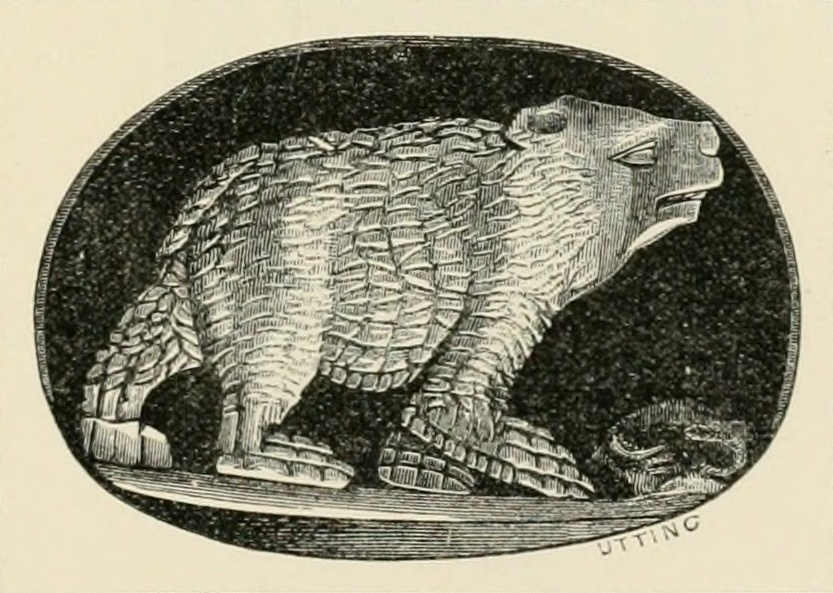
Depiction of a bear on a Roman-era engraved gem found in Britain.

The historic distribution of bears and the impression the Eurasian brown bear has made on people are reflected in the names of several localities (some notable examples include Bern, Medvednica, Otepää and Ayu-Dag), as well as personal names—for example, Xiong, Bernard, Arthur, Ursula, Urs, Ursicinus, Orsolya, Björn, Nedved, Medvedev, and Otso.

Bears of this subspecies appear very frequently in the fairy tales and fables of Europe, in particular, tales collected by Jakob and Wilhelm Grimm. The European brown bear was once common in Germany and alpine lands like Northern Italy, Eastern France, and most of Switzerland, and thus appears in tales of various dialects of German.

The bear is traditionally regarded as the symbol of Russian (military and political) might. It is also Finland's national animal; and in Croatia, a brown bear is depicted on the reverse of the Croatian 5 kuna coin, minted from 1993 to 2023.

According to Saxo Grammaticus the Swedish army utilized tame bears in battle to destroy the Danes in the Battle of Brávellir.

== See also ==
- Bear conservation
- Syrian brown bear
- Himalayan brown bear
