= Ursicinus =

Ursicinus, a Latin name derived from Ursus 'bear', can refer to:

- Antipope Ursicinus (or Ursinus)
- Saint Ursicinus (disambiguation) (several saints in Italy and elsewhere)
- Ursicinus (magister equitum), a Roman general of the fourth century
- Ursicinus (king) (4th century), an Alemannic petty king
- Ursicinus (Bishop of Ravenna) (6th century), who ordered the Basilica of Sant'Apollinare in Classe built.
