= Saint Ursicinus =

Saint Ursicinus may refer to:

- Saint Ursicinus of Ravenna (d. 67), Italian physician and Roman Catholic martyr, feast June 19
- Ursicinus of Brescia (d. 347), Italian bishop and saint, feast December 1
- St. Ursicinus (356–387), bishop of Sens in northern France
- Ursicinus (Bishop of Ravenna), archbishop of Ravenna from 533 to 536
- Ursicinus of Saint-Ursanne (d. 625), Irish missionary to present-day Switzerland, feast December 20
- St. Ursicinus (d. 760), bishop of Chur in Switzerland
