= Barbara Longhi =

Italian artist (1552–1638)

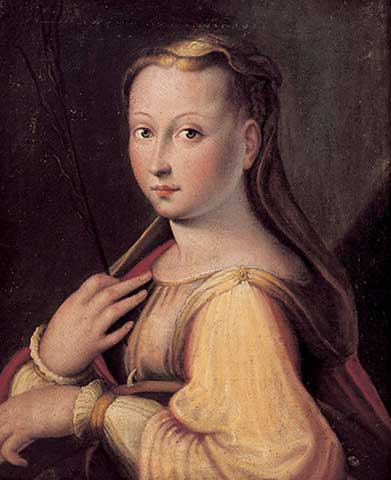
- Self-portrait, as Saint Catherine of Alexandria
- Born: 21 September 1552; Ravenna, Papal States
- Died: 23 December 1638 (aged 86); Ravenna, Papal States
- Known for: Painting
- Father: Luca Longhi

Barbara Longhi (English: /bɑːrˈbɑːrə ˈlɒŋɡi/ bar-BAR-ə LONG-ghee, Italian: [ˈbarbara ˈloŋɡi]; 21 September 1552 – 23 December 1638) was an Italian painter. She was much admired in her lifetime as a portraitist, although most of her portraits are now lost or unattributed. Her work, such as her many Madonna and Child paintings, earned her a fine reputation as an artist.

== Life and work ==
Barbara Longhi was born on 21 September 1552 in the northern Italian city of Ravenna, where she spent her entire life. Her father, Luca Longhi (1507–1580), was a well-known Mannerist painter, and her older brother Francesco (1544–1618) was also a painter. Both siblings received painting education from their father and were part of his studio, with Barbara assisting in such projects as work on large altarpieces. She also modelled and gained some familiarity with the process of marketing her artwork to patrons. Although her training was completed by 1570, her ties to her family and to her father's workshop remained strong. Very little is known of her life, not even whether she ever married.

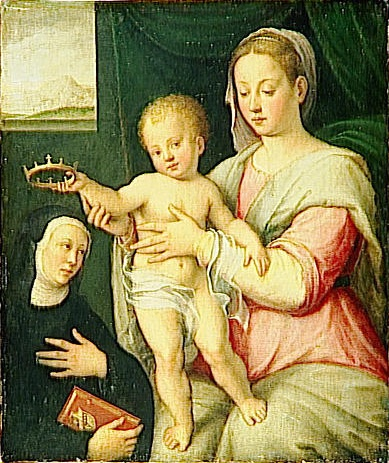
Virgin and Child with Saint, ca. 1590–95

Longhi was very respected as a portraitist, but only one of her portraits, the Camaldolese Monk, is known today. This is also her only known painting depicting an adult male, and one of only a few that includes a date (although the last digit is not entirely legible; it may be 1570 or 1573).

Longhi's father had depicted her as Saint Barbara in his 1570 painting Virgin and Child Enthroned with Saints. Longhi also probably modelled for her father's Nuptials of Cana. Her Saint Catherine of Alexandria (above) bears a strong resemblance to her father's depictions of her in the two paintings mentioned above, and it is generally acknowledged as a self-portrait. Of Longhi's portrayal of herself as the aristocratic, cultured Saint Catherine of Alexandria, Irene Graziani writes that "when she exhibits an image of herself, Barbara, too, is presented according to the model of the virtuous, elegant and erudite woman, revisiting the themes which Lavinia [Fontana] had developed several years earlier in Bologna, according to a repertoire tied to late Mannerism". It has been suggested that Longhi may have presented her self-portrait as the devotional image of a saint in order to avoid the appearance of indulging in the sin of vanity. Originally commissioned for the monastery of Sant'Apollinare in Classe, the painting was acquired by the Museo d'Arte della Città di Ravenna in 1829, and underwent a restoration in 1980. Several other of her depictions of Catherine of Alexandria exist.

Most of Longhi's paintings are unsigned, but on one she included the initials "B.L.F.", standing for "Barbara Longhi fecit" ("made by Barbara Longhi") and on another, "B.L.P.", for "Barbara Longhi pinxit" ("painted by Barbara Longhi"). As almost all of her work was unsigned, it is unknown how many paintings she created or are still in existence. Only about fifteen are definitively attributed to her. Of those, about twelve are paintings of the Virgin and Child; such paintings were very popular during the Counter-Reformation. It is thought that some of her works may be erroneously attributed to her father.

Among Longhi's paintings which do not depict the Madonna is Judith with the Head of Holofernes (ca. 1570–75). This subject was also painted by other female artists including Fede Galizia, Elisabetta Sirani and Artemisia Gentileschi. Longhi's version differs greatly from two versions painted by Gentileschi in that it does not depict the violent act; instead, her Judith appears to seek forgiveness as she looks heavenward. This is consistent with Counter-Reformation ideas about willingness to admit guilt and believing in absolution for the penitent.

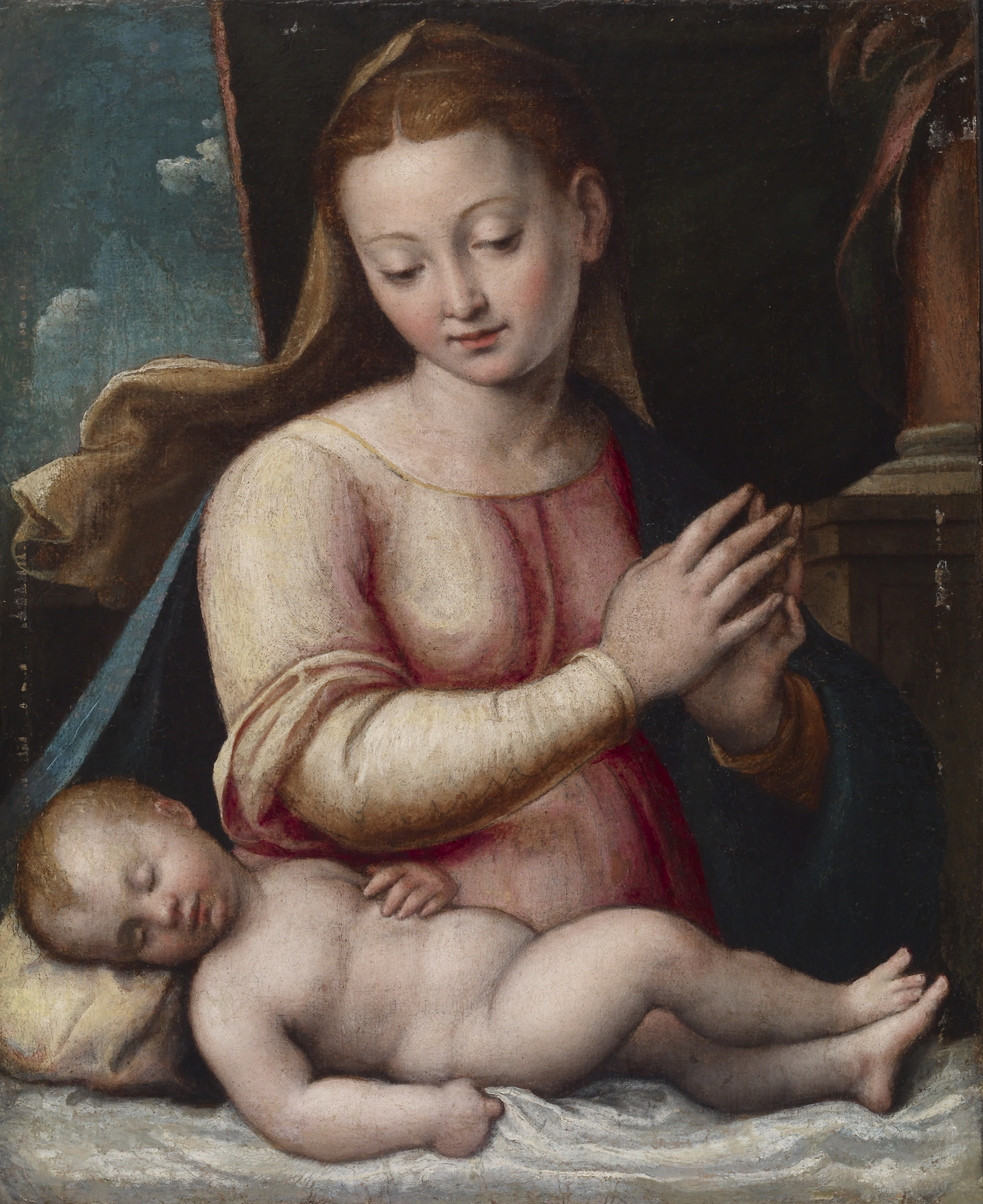
Madonna Adoring the Child, ca. 1600–05

The simplicity of composition and subtle colour palette used in her paintings also reflect the doctrines of the Counter-Reformation. Her relatively small works, as opposed to the large altarpieces created by her father, are indicative of their intended emphasis on devotional thoughts. She sought to evoke empathy in the viewer with her subjects. She resisted the trend to create huge Biblical scenes, instead concentrating on serene depictions of the Virgin and Child.

Her artistic influences included Raphael, Antonio da Correggio, Parmigianino, Marcantonio Raimondi, and Agostino Veneziano. The international success of famed female Italian painter Sofonisba Anguissola may have also served as an inspiration. While influenced by these major figures, her own unique style evolved; for example, her delicate rendering of features such as arms and necks on her Madonnas, and her use of a "warm and subtle golden palette". She "links traditional composition with intensity of feeling and innovative colouring."

She died in Ravenna on 23 December 1638, at the age of 86.

== Assessment ==
Longhi is one of the few female artists mentioned in the second edition (1568) of Italian painter and art historian Giorgio Vasari's epic work Lives of the Most Excellent Painters, Sculptors, and Architects. Vasari writes that Longhi "draws very well, and she has begun to colour some things with good grace and manner". But as Germaine Greer discussed in her The Obstacle Race: The Fortunes of Women Painters and Their Work, such "haphazard" selections of women artists including Longhi rarely offered "serious criticism of their achievement." Greer then offered her own assessment: "Barbara's output was considerable, all small pictures, remarkable for their purity of line and soft brilliance of colour" and "Barbara Longhi brings to her extremely conservative picture-making a simplicity and intensity of feeling quite beyond her mannerist father and her dilettante brother."

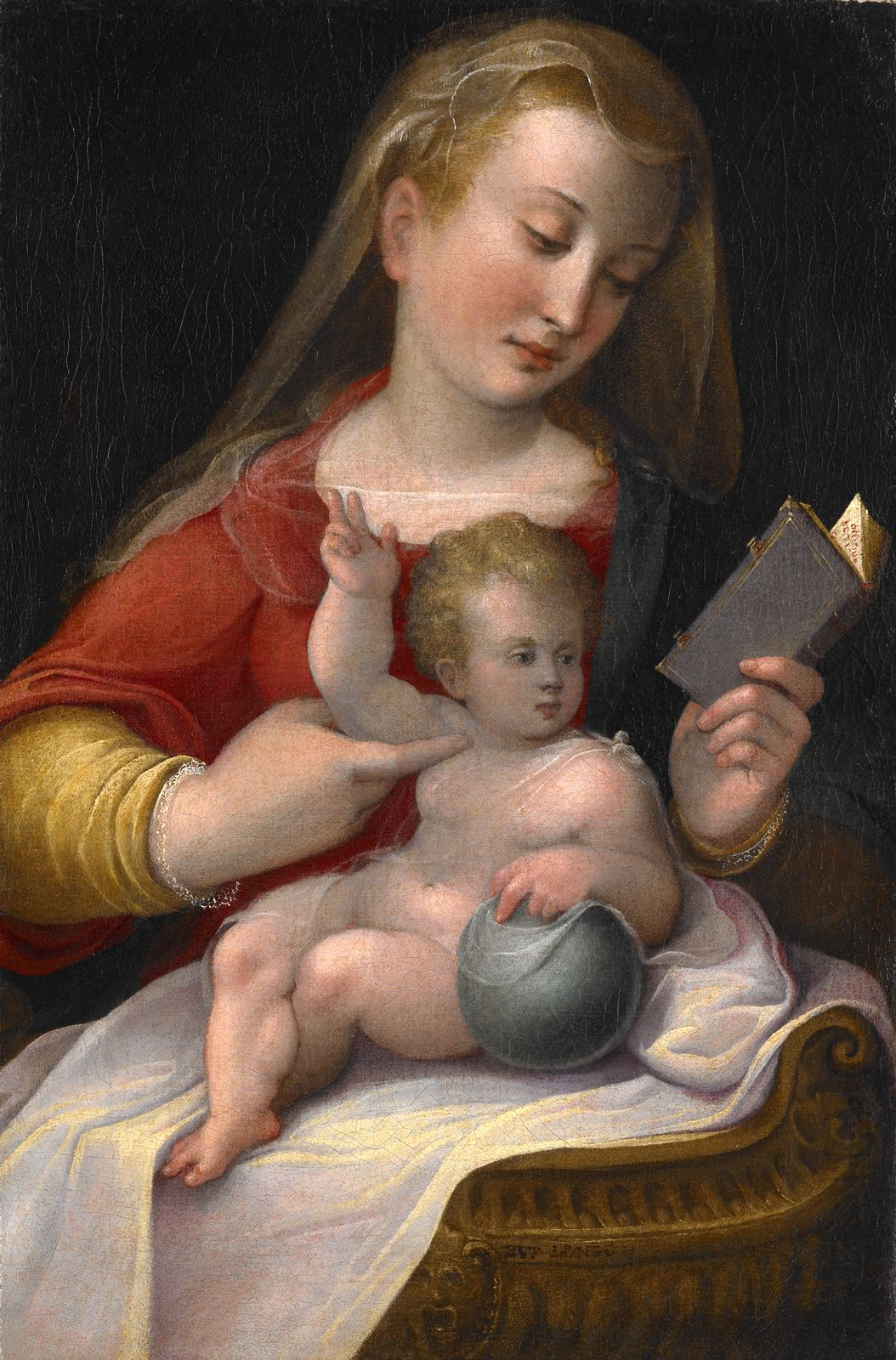
Madonna and Child, ca. 1580–85

Muzio Manfredi assessed Longhi's talent in a 1575 lecture in Bologna:

You should know that in Ravenna lives today a girl of eighteen years of age, daughter of the Excellent painter Messer Luca Longhi. She is so wonderful in this art that her own father begins to be astonished by her, especially in her portraits as she barely glances at a person that she can portray better than anybody else with the sitter posing in front.

Despite a measure of fame in her home town of Ravenna, Longhi was not well known elsewhere during her lifetime. Her paintings provide some insight into the Counter-Reformation's influence on regional art.

== Collections ==
The Museo d'Arte della Città di Ravenna owns seven works by Barbara Longhi, as well as eleven of her father Luca's and three by her brother Francesco.

Her work is represented in the collections of the Musée du Louvre (Paris), National Museum of Art of Romania (Bucharest), Pinacoteca di Brera (Milan), Pinacoteca Nazionale di Bologna, Museo Biblioteca del Grappa, and Indianapolis Museum of Art, and also in the Santa Maria Maggiore (Ravenna).

== Sources ==
- Banta, Andaleeb Badiee and Alexa Greist, with Theresa Kutasz Christensen. Making her Mark: A History of Women Artists in Europe, 1400-1800. Fredericton, New Brunswick (Canada): Gooselane Editions, 2023. ISBN 9781773103181.
- Ceroni, Nadia (2007). "Barbara Longhi". In National Museum of Women in the Arts (ed.). Italian Women Artists from Renaissance to Baroque. Milan, Italy: Skira Editore S.p.A. ISBN 978-88-7624-919-8.
- Cheney, Liana De Girolami (2001). Delia Gaze (ed.). Concise Dictionary of Women Artists. Taylor & Francis. ISBN 978-1-57958-335-4.
- Greer, Germaine (2001). The Obstacle Race: The Fortunes of Women Painters and Their Work. Tauris Parke. ISBN 978-1-86064-677-5.
- Tinagli, Paola (1997). Women in Italian Renaissance Art: Gender, Representation, Identity. Manchester University Press. ISBN 978-0-7190-4054-2.
- Uglow, Jennifer S.; Hendry, Maggy (1999). The Northeastern Dictionary of Women's Biography. UPNE. ISBN 978-1-55553-421-9.
