= Luca Longhi =

Italian painter (1507–1580)

Luca Longhi (14 January 1507 – 12 August 1580) was an Italian painter of the late-Renaissance or Mannerist period, active in and near Ravenna, where he mainly produced religious paintings and portraits.

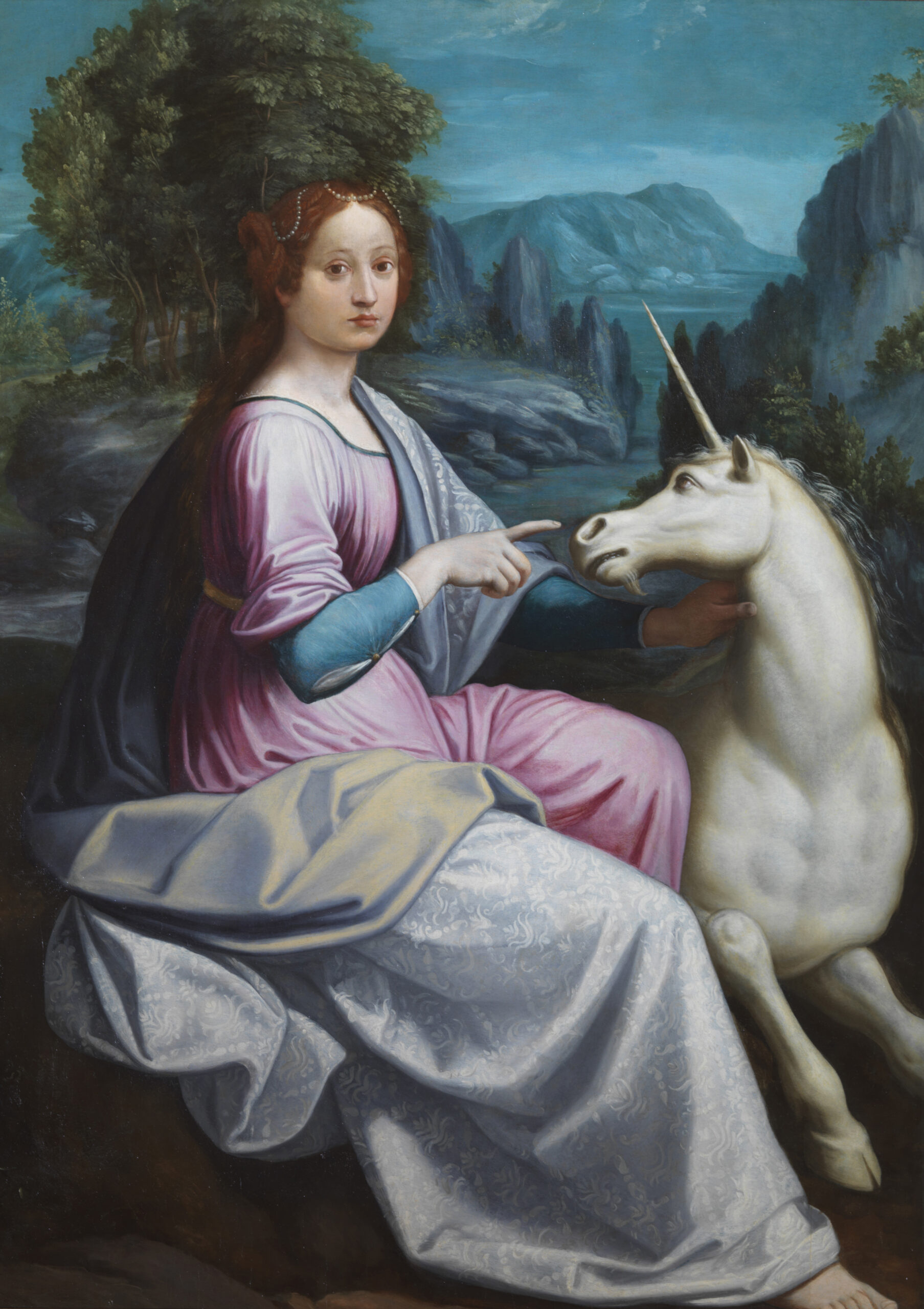
The Lady and the Unicorn by Luca Longhi, portrait of Giulia Farnese

== Biography ==
It is unclear who his master was. Among his portraits, he painted a portrait of Giovanni Guidiccione, bishop of Fossombrone; of Giulio dalla Rovere, Cardinal of Urbino, who died 1577; as well as Alessandro Sforza, Cardinal Legate of Romagna; Cristoforo Boncòmpagni, archbishop of Ravenna; and Giovanni Battista Rossi, Generale del Carmine, who died in Rome in 1577.

His works include The Marriage of Saint Catherine (1529), Lady and the Unicorn, Adoration by the Shepherds, Virgin and Child with Saints Sebastian and Rocco, Martyrdom of Saint Ursicinus (oil on canvas) and Cesare Hercolani.

He trained two of his children, Francesco Longhi (1544–1618) and Barbara Longhi (1552–1638). Barbara collaborated with him on several of his later works, including Marriage of Canae (1580), incorporating portraits of Barbara and Francesco Longhi. Both he and his daughter were among the artists mentioned by Vasari.

Along with his son Francesco, he painted a Marriage at Canna for the refectory of the convent and the organ doors of the church of the Camaldolesi in Ravenna. In the picture were depicted his daughter Barbara, his son Francesco, and the Abbot of the Monastery, Don Pietro Bagnolo da Bagnacavallo. He painted a Venus for Quaranta Aldrovandi of Bologna. The cavaliere Pomponio Spreti had many works, among them Madonna and child and St John, which he donated to Cardinal Sforza. He painted an Ascension of Christ for the Cathedral of Cervia. He died in Ravenna of a catarrhal illness that spread from Paris throughout Italy. He was buried in San Domenico, Ferrara.
