= Ecclesius of Ravenna =

Bishop of Ravenna

Saint Ecclesius
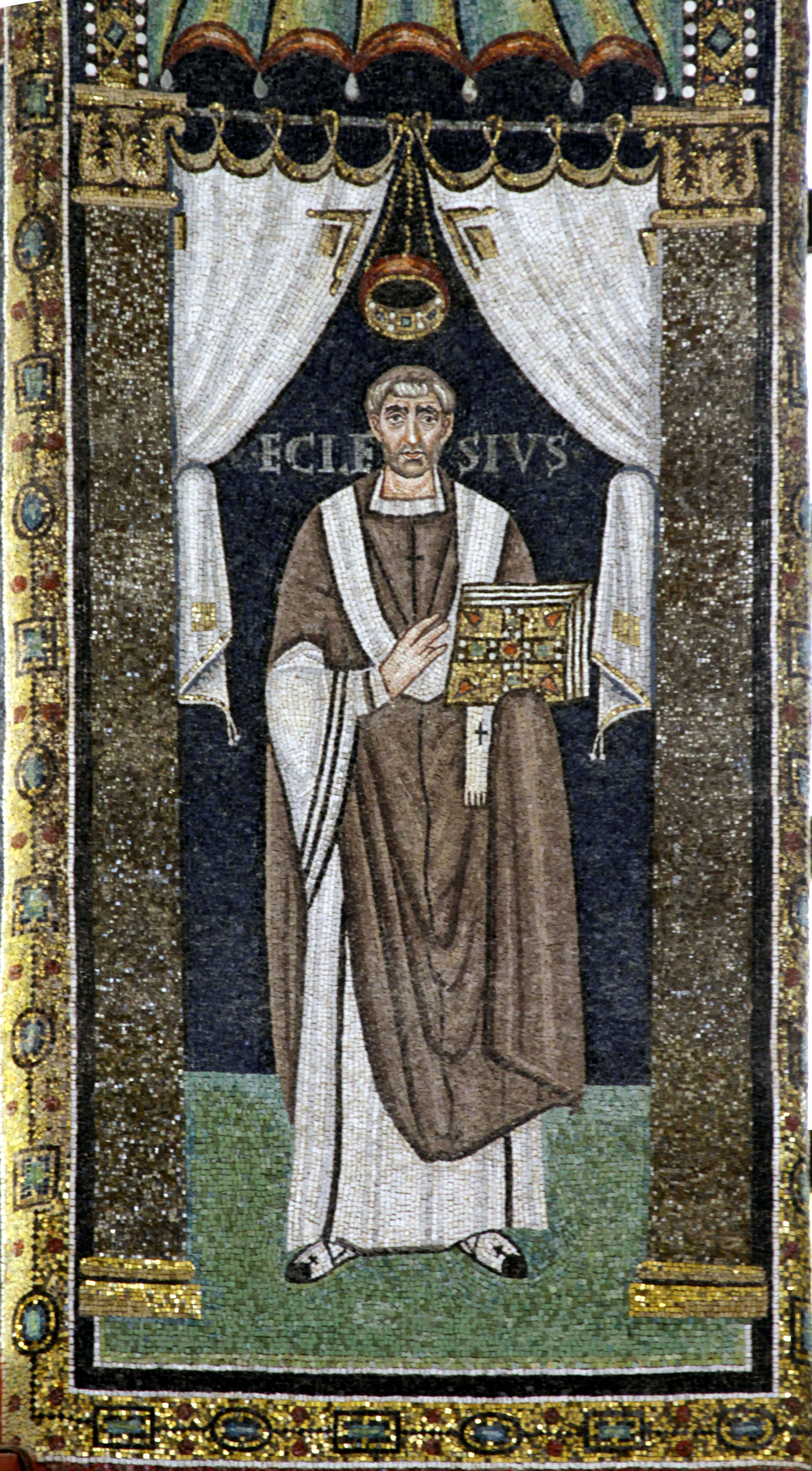
- Mosaic portrait of Ecclesius in the Basilica di Sant'Apollinare in Classe, Ravenna

Bishop of Ravenna
- Born: Kingdom of Italy
- Died: 532; Ravenna
- Venerated in: Roman Catholic Church, Eastern Orthodox Church
- Canonized: Pre-congregation
- Feast: 27 July

Saint Ecclesius (died 532) was bishop of Ravenna from AD 521 to 532. He is best known as the founder of the Basilica of San Vitale in Ravenna.

== Biography ==
Ecclesius was one of the bishops who joined Pope John I in 525 when he was sent by Theodoric the Great to Constantinople to express opposition to the Byzantine emperor Justin I's edict against Arian Christianity.

Upon his return to Ravenna, Ecclesius came into conflict with a group of local priests, who protested against the bishop to Pope Felix IV. Felix instead rebuked the dissenting clergy and reaffirmed Ecclesius's authority in a letter preserved by the historian Andreas Agnellus.

It was also after his return from the east that Ecclesius began construction of the famous Basilica of San Vitale with the support of Julian the Banker (Julius Argentarius). He also began construction of the Church of Santa Maria Maggiore around the same time.

Ecclesius died in 532, and his remains are housed in the Basilica of San Vitale. He was succeeded by Ursicinus as bishop of Ravenna.

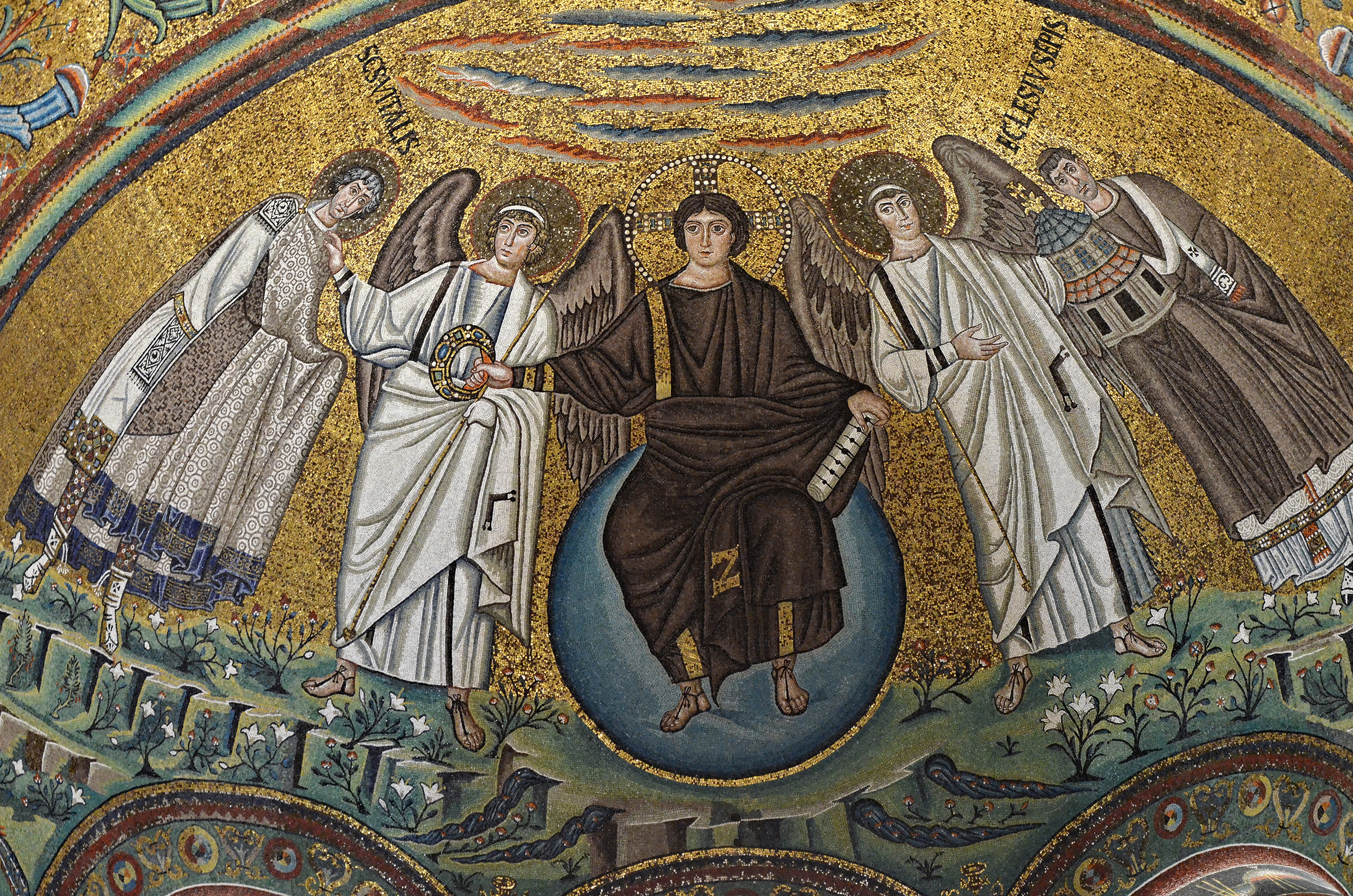
Ecclesius (far right) depicted alongside Christ and Saint Vitalis, Basilica of San Vitale, Ravenna
