= Ursicinus of Ravenna =

Saint Ursicinus of Ravenna
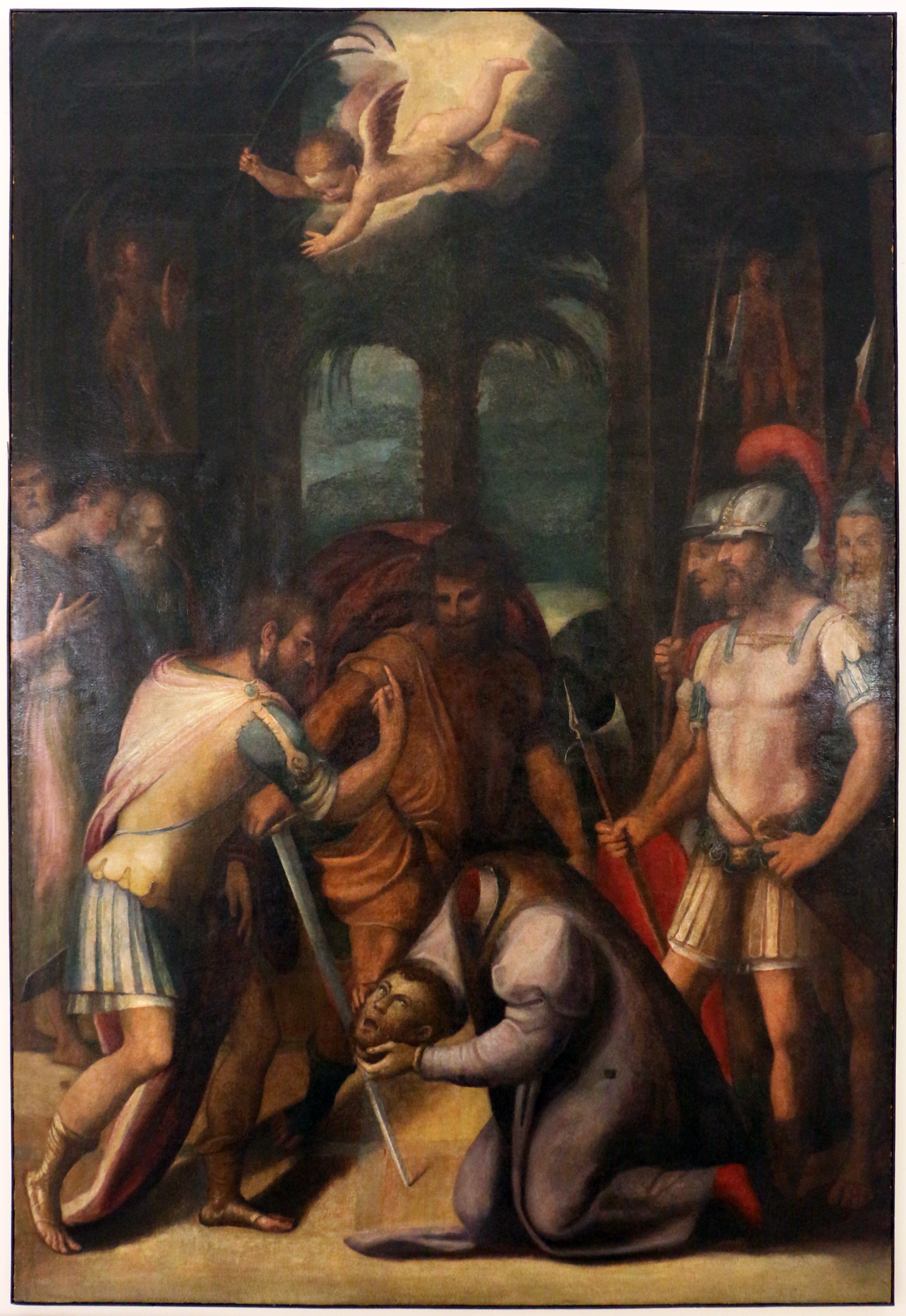
- Martyrdom of Saint Ursicinus by Luca Longhi (1558)

Martyr
- Died: c. 67 AD
- Venerated in: Catholic Church
- Feast: June 19

Ursicinus of Ravenna (Italian: Sant' Ursicino) (d. ca. 67) is venerated as a martyr by the Catholic Church. He was said to be a physician of Ravenna. His legend is connected with that of Vitalis, who is said to have encouraged the wavering Ursicinus after the physician was sentenced to death for his faith. After he was beheaded, Vitalis buried him in Ravenna.

He should not be confused with Bishop Ursicinus of Ravenna (6th century), who ordered the Basilica of Sant'Apollinare in Classe to be built.
