= Nedvěd =

Nedvěd (Czech pronunciation: [ˈnɛdvjɛt]) (feminine Nedvědová) is a Czech surname. It is an old variant of the Czech word Medvěd, which means 'bear'.

The following people have the surname Nedvěd:

- Jaroslav Nedvěd (born 1969), Czech ice hockey player, brother of Petr
- Karel Nedvěd, Bohemian athlete
- Karim Walid (born 1997), Egyptian football player nicknamed Nedvěd
- Marta Nedvědová (born 1976), Czech sport shooter
- Miroslav Nedvěd, Czechoslovak slalom canoer
- Pavel Nedvěd (born 1972), Czech football player
- Petr Nedvěd (born 1971), Czech ice hockey player
- Vladimír Nedvěd (1917–2012), Czechoslovak-born Australian World War II veteran
- Zdeněk Nedvěd (born 1975), Czech ice hockey player
