= Basilica of Sant'Apollinare in Classe =

Byzantine-style minor basilica in Ravenna, Italy

Basilica of Saint Apollinaris in Classe Basilica di Sant'Apollinare in Classe
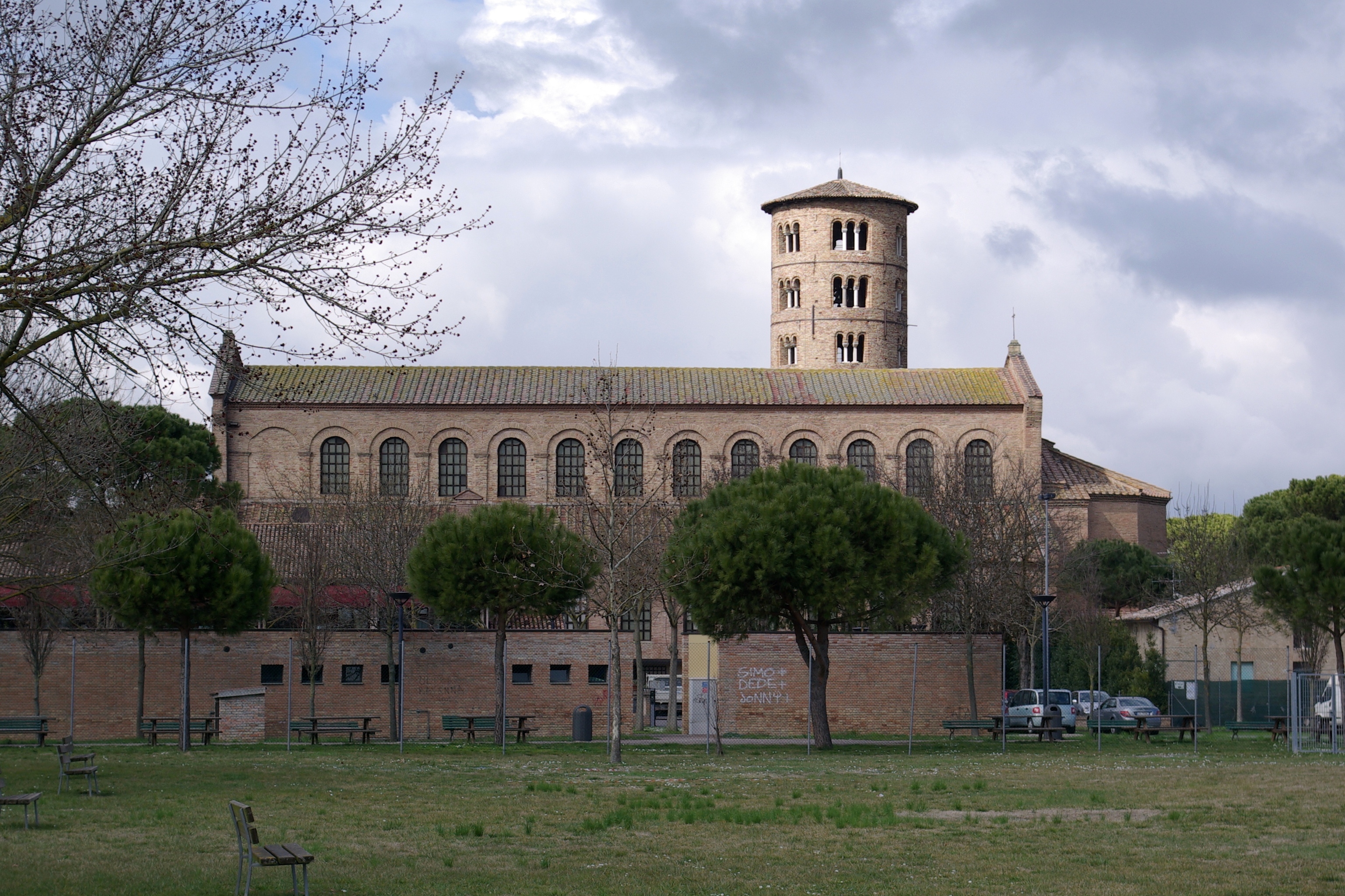
- The Basilica of Sant'Apollinare in Classe

- Location within Italy

Religion
- Affiliation: Catholic Church
- Province: Archdiocese of Ravenna-Cervia
- Region: Emilia-Romagna
- Year consecrated: 549

Location
- Location: Classe, Ravenna, Italy
- Coordinates: 44°22′49″N 12°13′59″E

Architecture
- Style: Byzantine architecture
- Groundbreaking: Early 6th century
- UNESCO World Heritage Site
- Official name: Early Christian Monuments of Ravenna
- Type: Cultural
- Criteria: i, ii, iii, iv
- Designated: 1996 (20th session)
- Reference no.: 788
- State Party: Italy
- Region: Europe and North America

The west front or façade

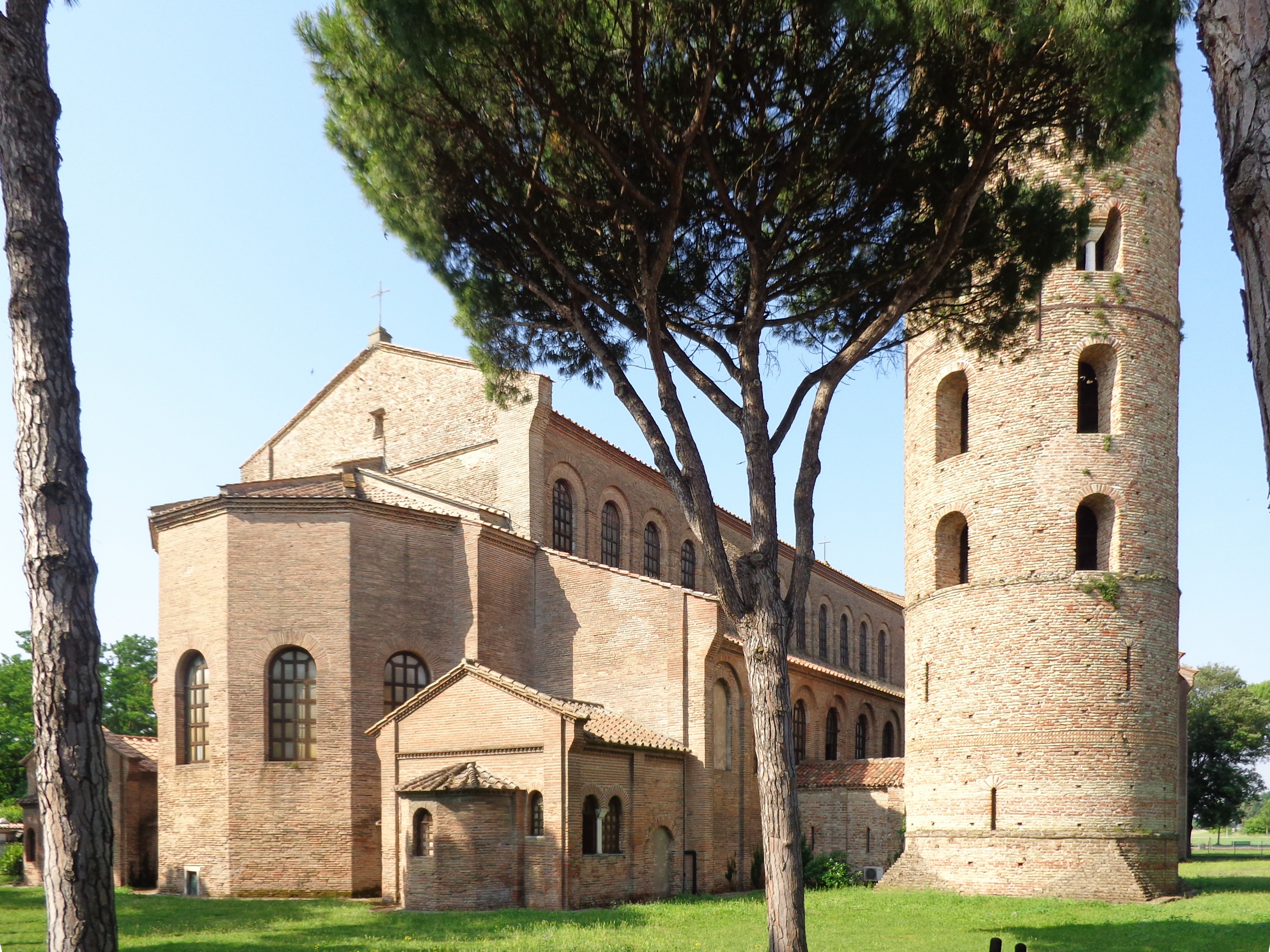
Apse and tower

The Basilica of Sant'Apollinare in Classe ("Saint Apollinaris in Classe") is a church in Classe, Ravenna, Italy, consecrated on 9 May 549 by the bishop Maximian and dedicated to Saint Apollinaris, the first bishop of Ravenna and Classe.

An important monument of late Ancient Roman architecture, early church architecture and Byzantine art, in 1996 it was inscribed with seven other nearby monuments in the UNESCO World Heritage List, which described it as "an outstanding example of the early Christian basilica in its purity and simplicity of its design and use of space and in the sumptuous nature of its decoration". (See: Church architecture.)

== History ==
Work on Sant'Apollinare in Classe started at the beginning of the 6th century by order of Bishop Ursicinus, using money from the Roman banker Iulianus Argentarius. It was certainly located next to a Christian cemetery, and quite possibly on top of a pre-existing pagan one, as some of the ancient tombstones were re-used in its construction.

At that time, Classe was located on the shore and was the ancient home port of the Roman fleet which gave its name to the town. Due to the accumulation of silt, the coastline has since moved 9 kilometres (5.6 mi) to the east.

The imposing brick structure was consecrated on 9 May 549 by Bishop Maximian and dedicated to Saint Apollinaris. The Basilica is thus contemporary with the Basilica of San Vitale of Ravenna. The relics of Saint Apollinaris are today in the Basilica of Sant'Apollinare in Classe.

In the 15th century, Sigismondo Malatesta stripped the church of the marble covering the walls of the side aisles, to use it for the construction of the Tempio Malatestiano of San Francesco in Rimini.

== Architecture ==
=== Exterior ===
The exterior has a large facade with two simple uprights and one mullioned window with three openings. The narthex and building to the right of the entry are later additions, as is the fine 9th century round bell tower with mullioned windows.

Ravenna's tallest campanile was added to the church in the late 10th century.

=== Interior ===
The church has a central nave with two side aisles, a standard basilica design. An ancient altar in the mid of the nave covers the place of the saint's martyrdom. The church ends with a polygonal apse, sided by two chapels with apses.

The nave contains 24 columns of Greek marble. The carved capitals of the columns depict acanthus leaves, but unlike most such carvings the leaves appear twisted as if being buffeted by the wind. The faded frescos depict some of the archbishops of Ravenna, and date to the 18th century. The lateral walls are bare, but were certainly once covered with gorgeous mosaics. These were likely demolished by the Venetians in 1449, although they left the mosaic decoration in the apse and on the triumphal arch, the church's most striking features.

The upper section of the triumphal arch depicts, inside a medallion, Christ. At the sides, within a sea of clouds, are the winged symbols of the four Evangelists: the Eagle (John), the Winged Man (Matthew), the Lion (Mark), the Calf (Luke). The lower section has, at its two edges, the walls showing precious gems from which twelve lambs (symbols of the Twelve Apostles) exit. The sides of the arch show two palms which, in the Bible's symbolism, represent justice; under them are the archangels Michael and Gabriel, with the bust of St. Matthew and another unidentified saint.

The decoration of the apse date to the 6th century, and can be divided into two parts:

- in the upper one, a large disc encloses a starry sky in which is a cross with gems. Over the cross is a hand protruding from the clouds, the theme of the Hand of God. At the side of the disc are the figures of Elijah and Moses. The three lambs in the lower sector symbolize the saints Peter, James and John, alluding the Transfiguration of Jesus on Mount Tabor.
- in the lower one is a green valley with rocks, bush, plants and birds. In the middle is the figure of Saint Apollinaris, portrayed in the act of praying God to give grace to his faithful, symbolized by twelve white lambs.

The choice of the subject is closely linked to the fight against Arianism, as it restates both the divine and human nature of Christ, the former negated by the Arians. In addition, the representation of Apollinaris among the apostles was a legitimization of Maximian as the first bishop of the diocese.

In the spaces between the windows are the four bishops who founded the main basilicas in Ravenna: Urscinus, Ursus, Severus and Ecclesius, all with a book in a hand. At the sides of the apse are two 7th-century panels: the left one, which has largely been restored, portrays the Byzantine Emperor Constantine IV granting privileges to an envoy of the Ravenna's archbishop. In the right panel are Abraham, Abel and Melchisedek around an altar, on which they offer a sacrifice to God.

The Basilica's walls are lined by numerous sarcophagi from different centuries. They attest the changes of style from the 5th to the 8th centuries: from reliefs with human figures of the Roman sarcophagi, to Byzantine symbolism, to the increasing abstraction and simplification of these symbologies.

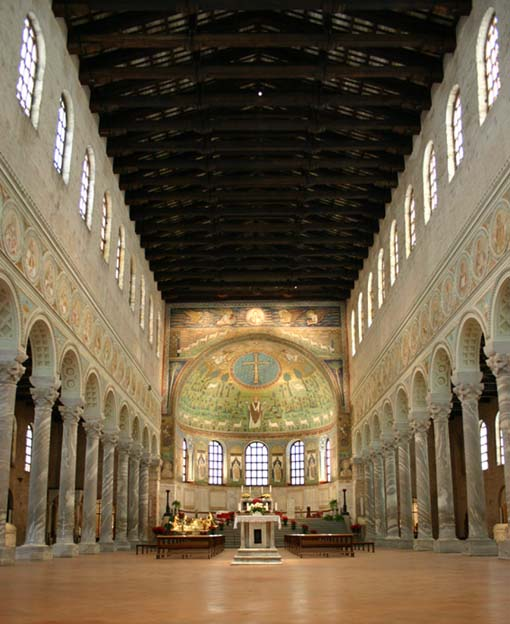
Image from the nave

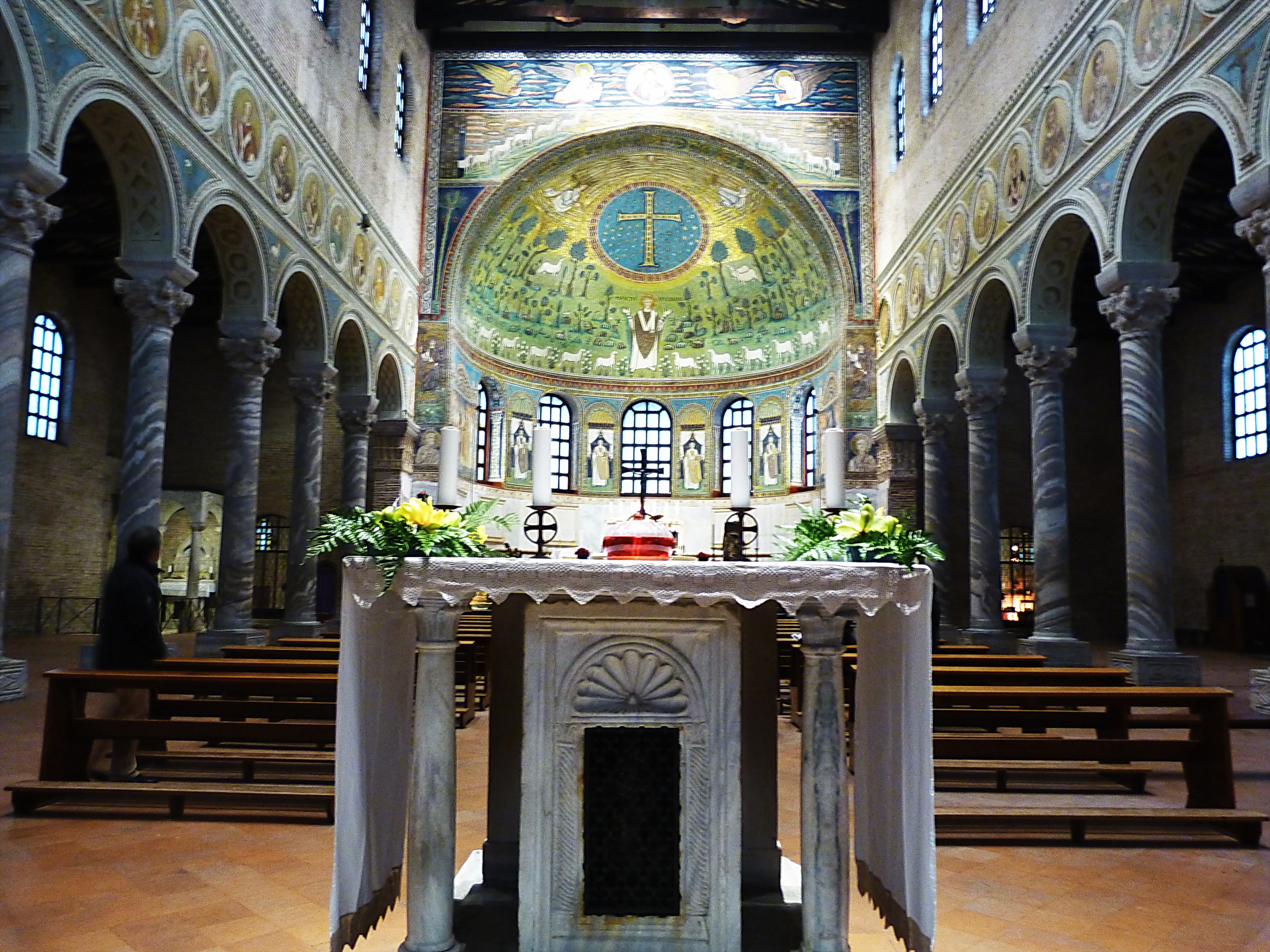
Altar with apse

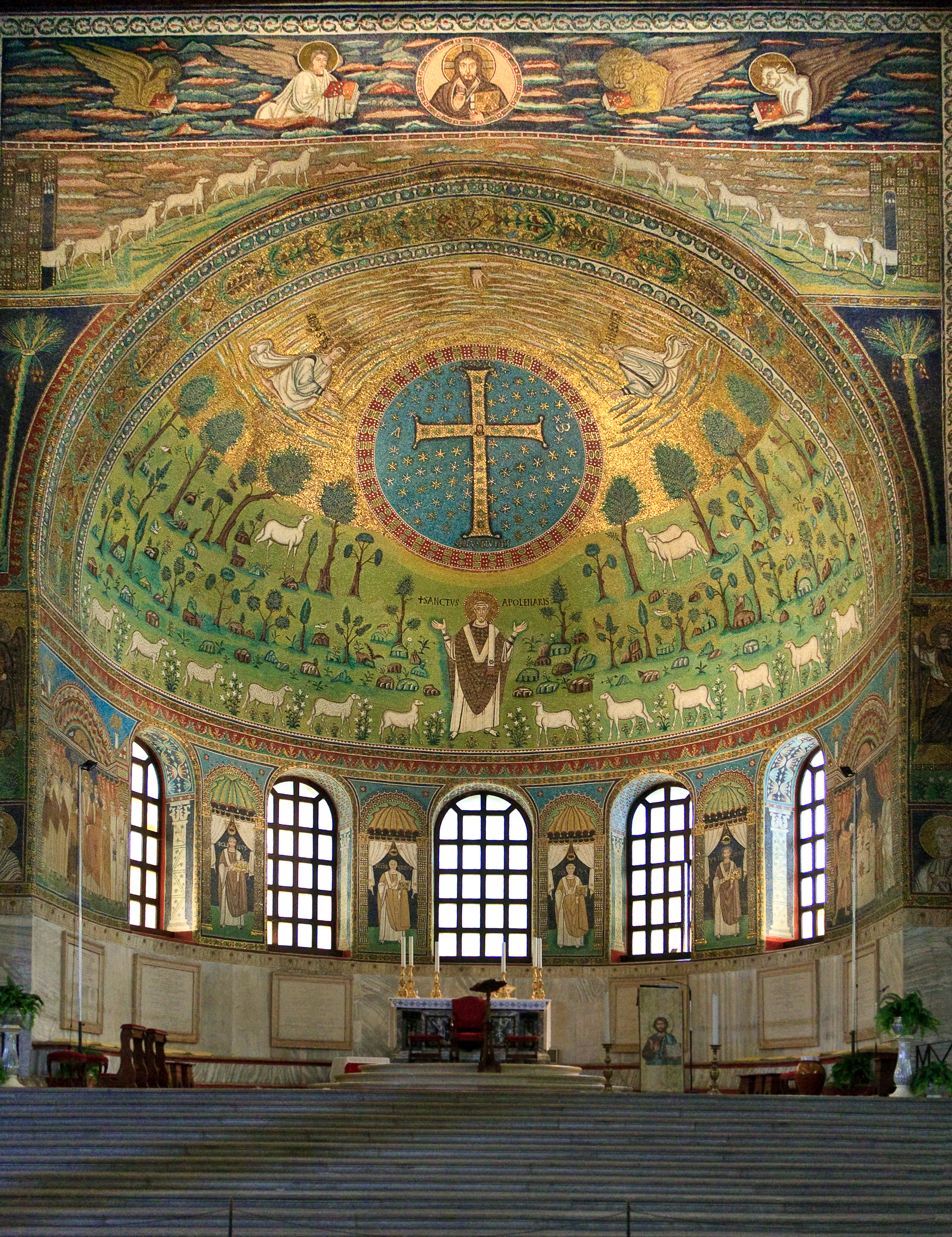
Apse with semi-dome and mosaic "Transfiguration of the Lord"

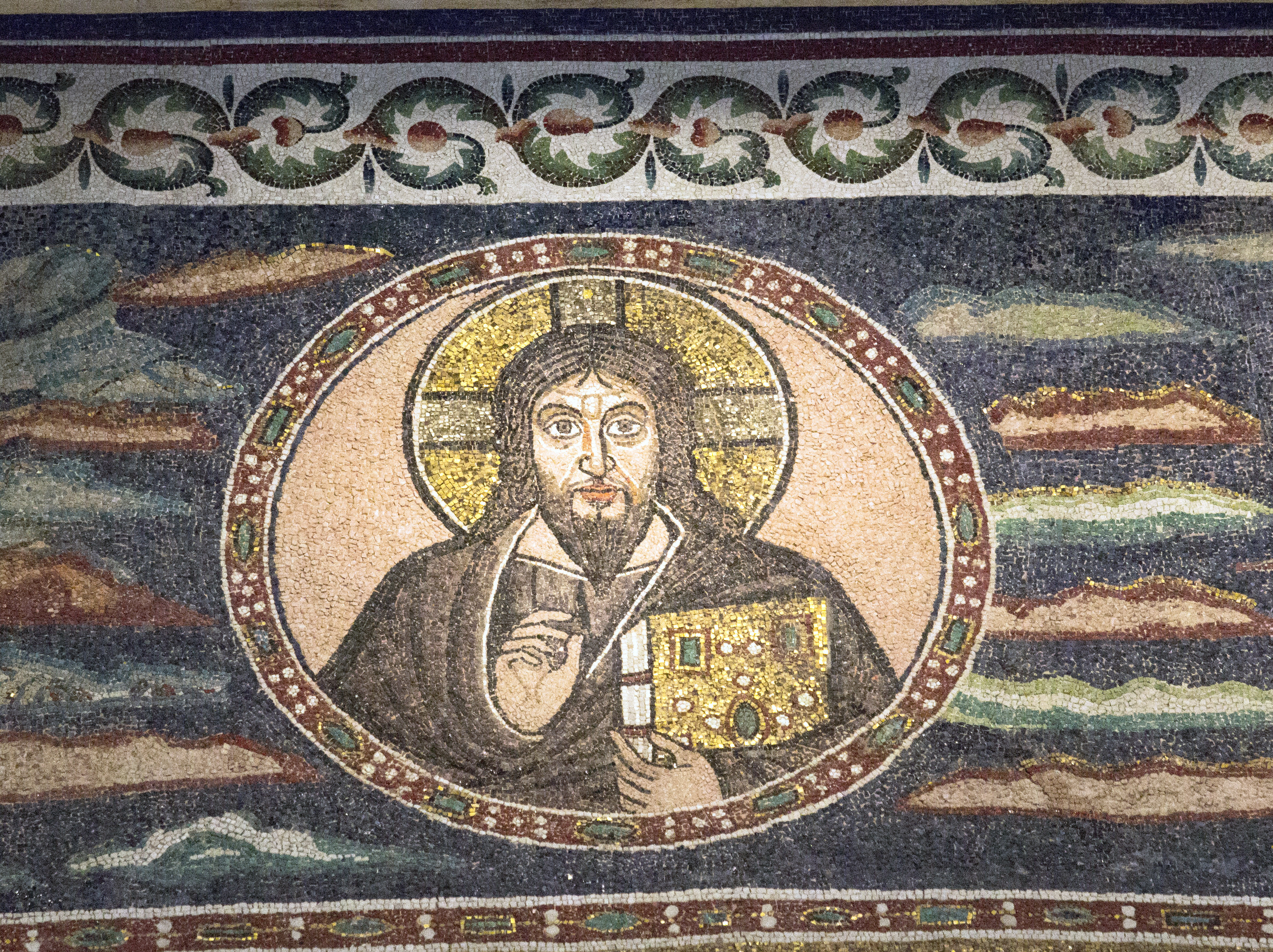
Christ preaching, Triumphal Arch

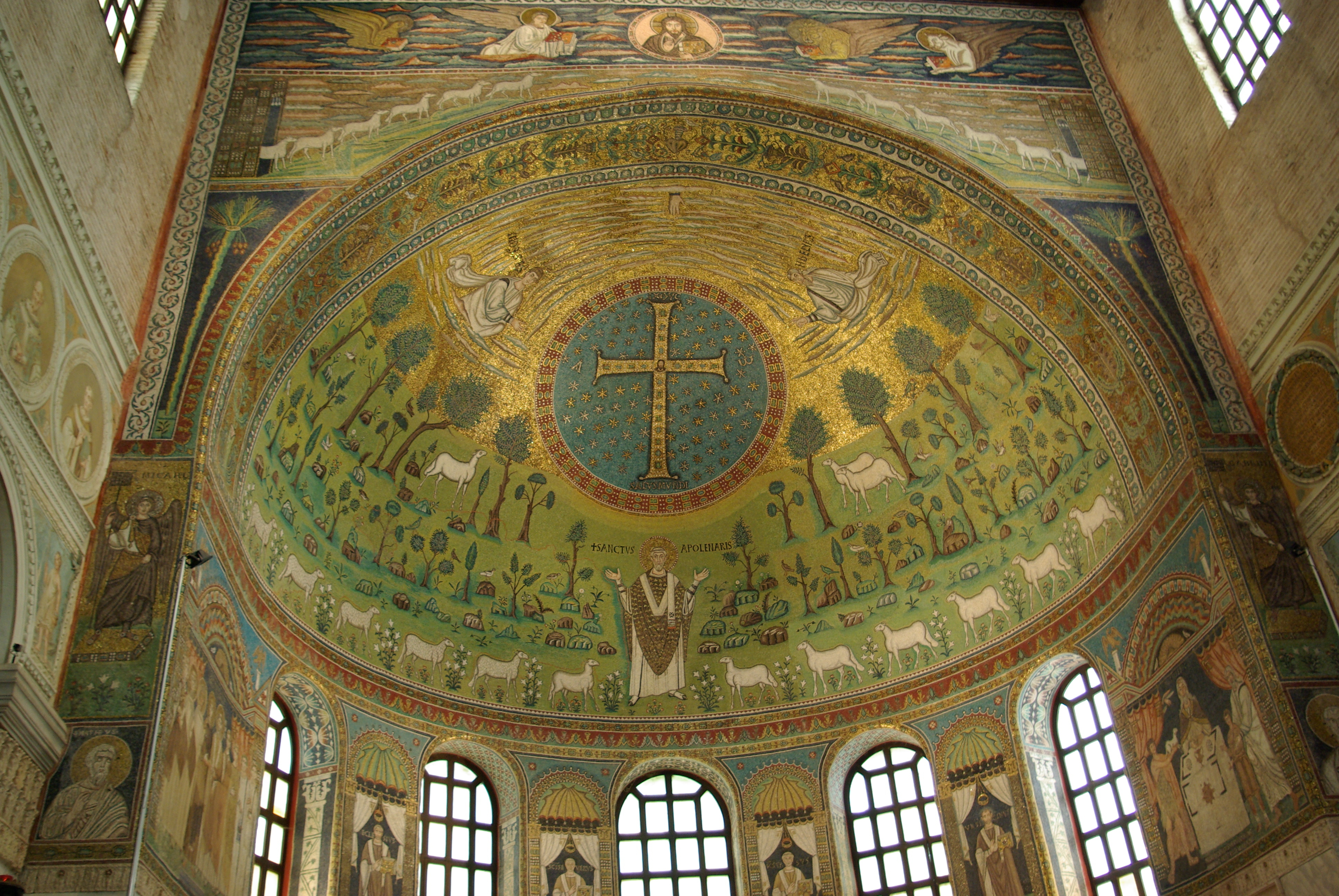
The apse is lavishly decorated with mosaics, such as the Crux Gemmata

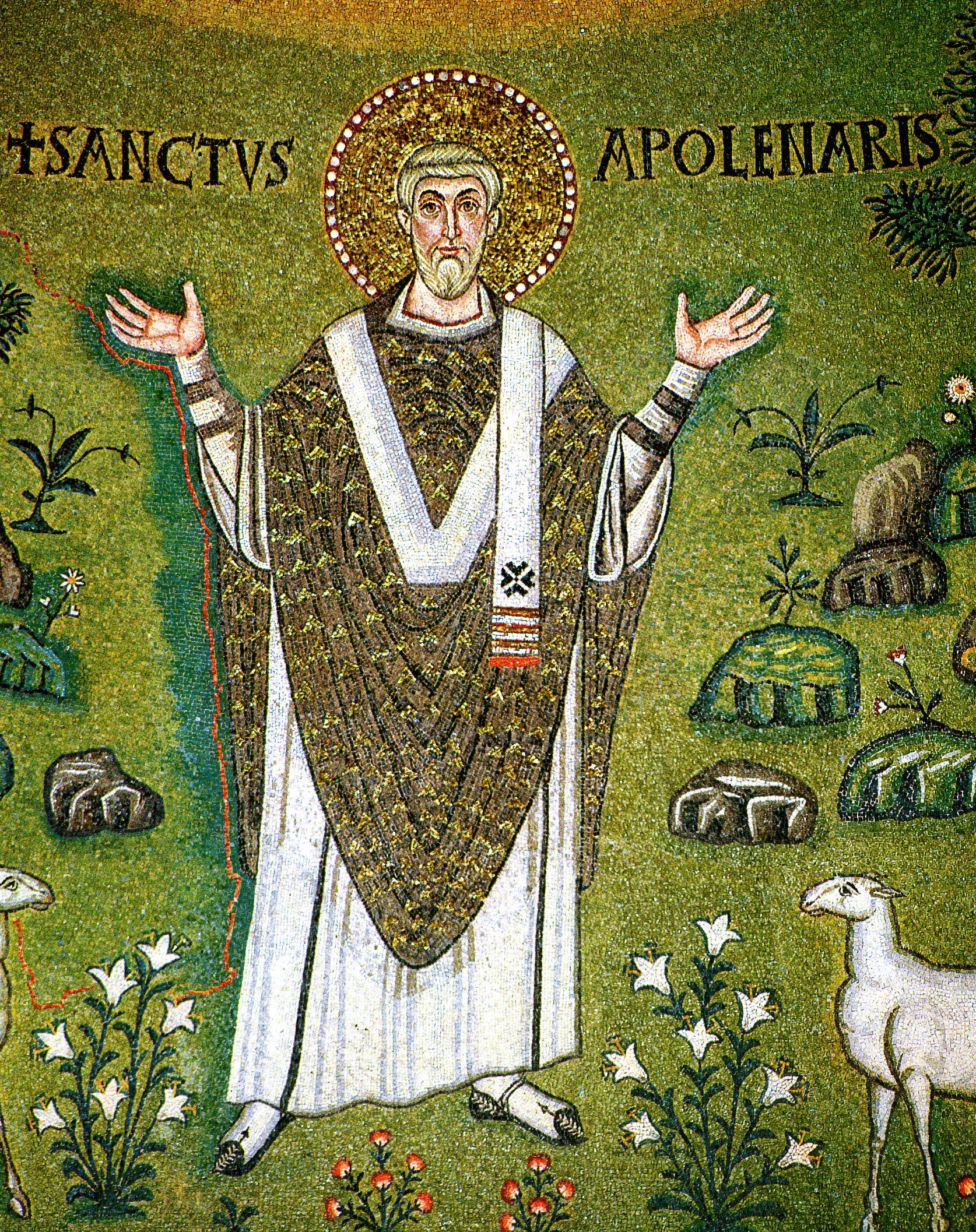
Saint Apollenaris

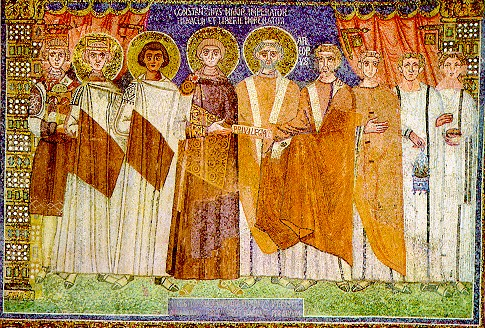
Mosaic panel of Emperor Constantine IV granting privileges to the Church of Ravenna

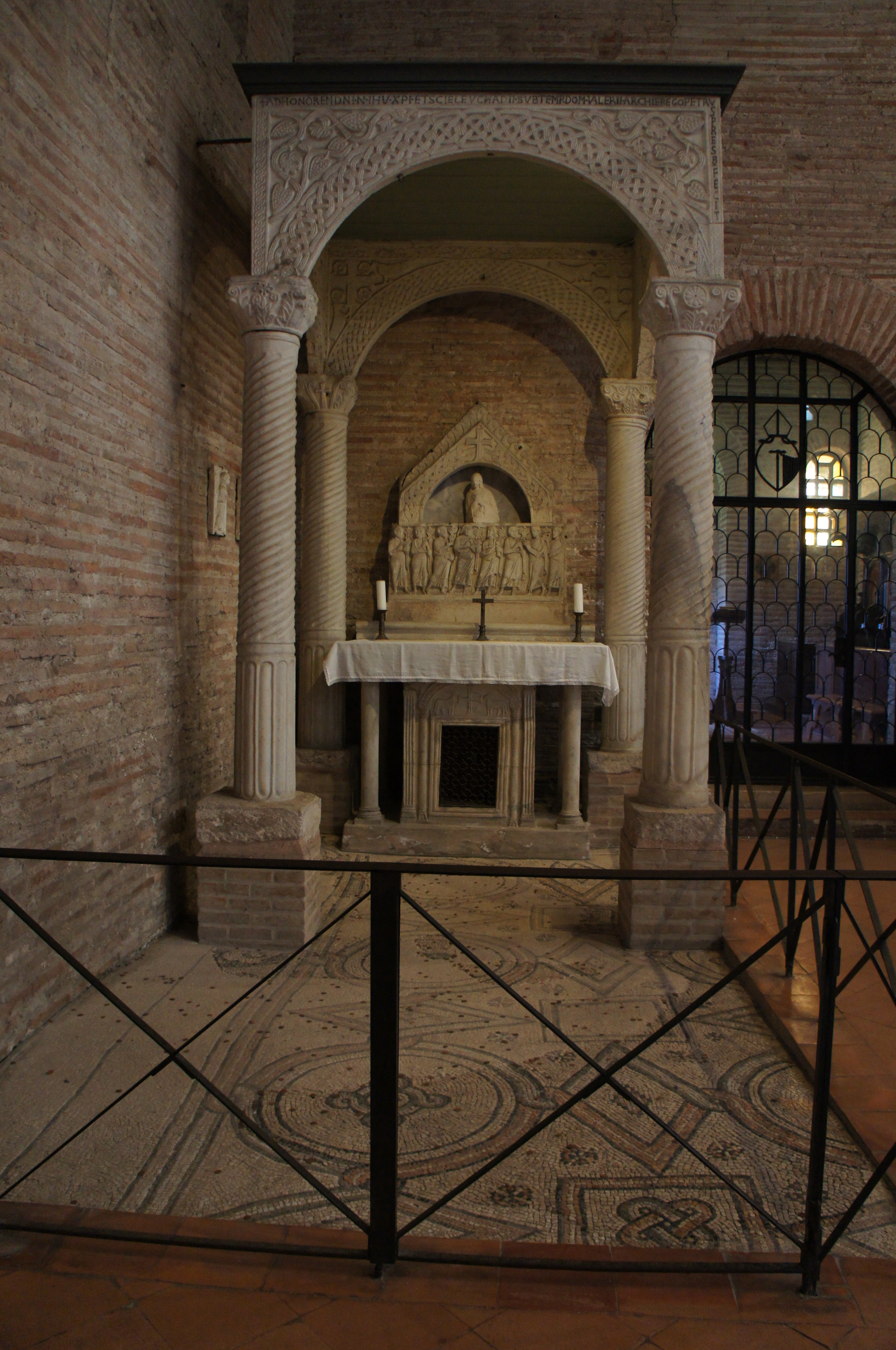
Canopy with twisted column shafts and remains of the original mosaic floor

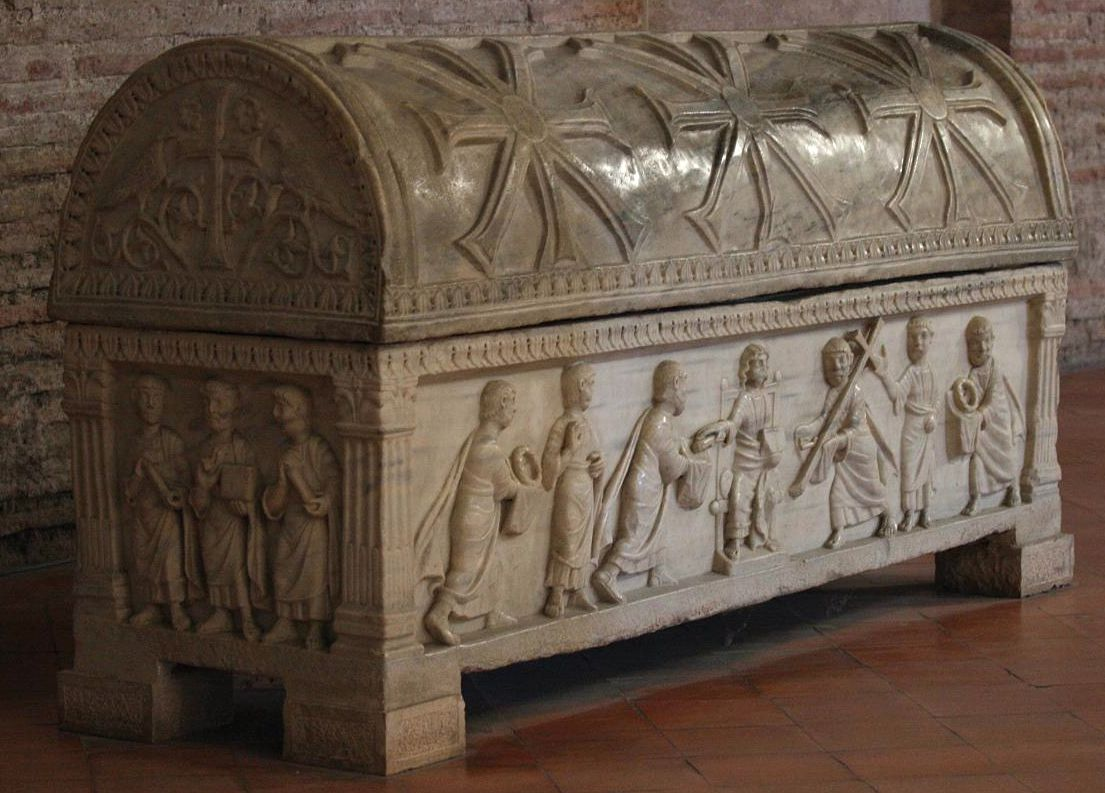
A bishop's late antique sarcophagus
