= Ursicinus (bishop of Ravenna) =

Saint Ursicinus
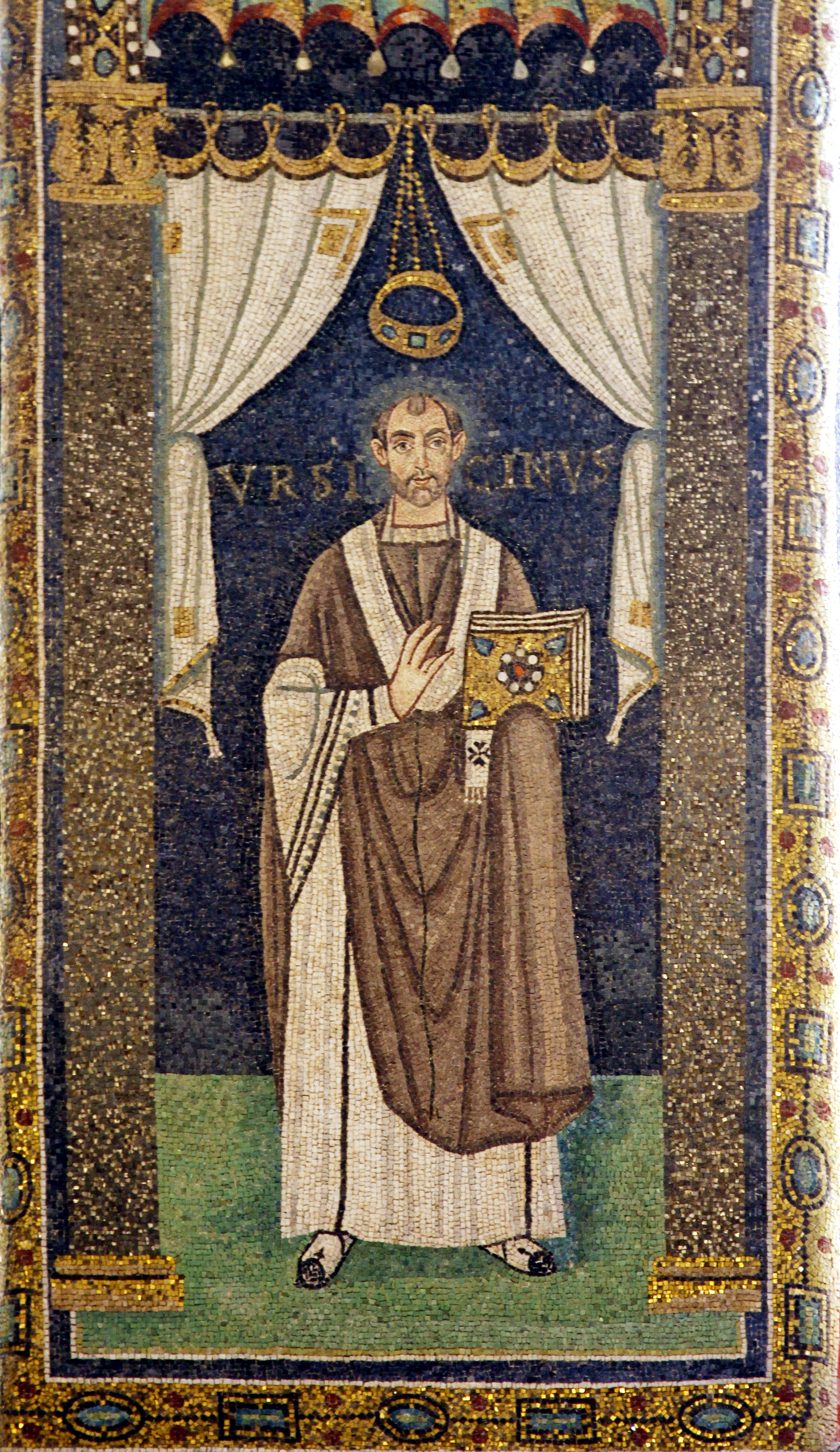
- Mosaic portrait of Ursicinus in the Basilica di Sant'Apollinare in Classe, Ravenna

Bishop of Ravenna
- Died: c. 536 AD; Ravenna
- Venerated in: Catholic Church
- Feast: September 5

Ursicinus (died c. 536 AD) is a saint of the Catholic Church and was Bishop of Ravenna from 533 to 536. He is not to be confused with the 1st-century saint Ursicinus of Ravenna.

Ursicinus' predecessor was bishop Ecclesius of Ravenna (522–532). Maybe Ursicinus didn't follow him directly (sede vacante). Ursicinus was a mandans (juridical client) for the Basilica of Sant'Apollinare in Classe. This is based on an inscription in the narthex of this church, handed down by the church historian Andreas Agnellus in the 9th century:

"B. Apolenaris Sacerdotis Basilica mandante Ursicino Episcopo a fundamentis Iulianus Argentarius aedificavit ornavit atque dedicavit consecrante Maximiano Episcopo.."

His cemetery lies in the Basilica of San Vitale, in the chapel of Nazarius and Celsus.

== Representation in Sant'Apollinare in Classe ==
He is represented in the apse together with the bishops Severus, Ursus and Ecclesius. Above the bishops, represented all without nimbus, diadems are hanging between gathered vela (curtains). Ursicinus wears an alba (white dalmatic), a planeta and a pallium, an ecclesiastical vestment only worn by popes and archbishops. He wears special calcei on his feet, they too a garment reserved for the upper class. In his left hand he holds the holy scripture, represented as richly ornated codex. As customary in the ancient world, he does not touch the holy object with his bare hands, but covers them with his planeta. The representations date from the 6th century and are executed as portraits for the recent bishops Ecclesius and Ursicinus.
