= A Struggle for Rome =

Multi-volume novel by Felix Dahn

- Author: Felix Dahn
- Original title: Ein Kampf um Rom
- Translator: Lily Wolffsohn
- Language: German
- Genre: Historical novel, German novel
- Publisher: Breitopf & Härtel, Leipzig (Richard Bentley & Son, London (en))
- Publication date: 1876-1878 (4 volumes)
- Publication place: Germany
- English publication date: 1878
- Pages: 1296 (first edition)
- ISBN: 978-1844014446
- OCLC: 36745149

A Struggle for Rome (alternatively A Fight for Rome) is a historical novel written by Felix Dahn (under the original title Ein Kampf um Rom which appeared in 1876).

== Plot summary ==
After the death of Theodoric the Great his successors try to maintain his legacy: an independent Ostrogothic Kingdom. They are opposed by the Eastern Roman Empire, ruled by emperor Justinian I. It is he who tries to restore the Roman Empire to its state before the Migration Period from his residence in Constantinople, which requires the capture of the Italian Peninsula and specifically Rome. Theodoric the Great is succeeded by his infant grandson Athalaric, supervised by his mother, Amalasuntha, as regent. The lack of a strong heir caused the network of alliances that surrounded the Ostrogothic state to disintegrate: the Visigothic kingdom regained its autonomy under Amalaric, the relations with the Vandals turned increasingly hostile, and the Franks embarked again on expansion, subduing the Thuringians and the Burgundians and almost evicting the Visigoths from their last holdings in southern Gaul. After Athalaric, Ostrogoths Theodahad, Witiges, Ildibad, Totila and Teia succeed Theodoric the Great as king of the Ostrogoths, in that order, and theirs is the task to defend what is left of their kingdom. They are assisted by Theodoric's faithful armourer Hildebrand. The names of the chapters in the book follow the chronology of the Gothic kings.

Meanwhile, a (fictional) Roman prefect of the Cethegus clan, has his own agenda to rebuild the empire. He represents the majority of the population as a former citizen of the Western Roman Empire. He too tries to get rid of the Goths but is at the same time determined to keep the Eastern Romans out of "his Italy".

In the end, the Eastern Romans outlast both the Ostrogoths and Cethegus and reclaim Italy. Cethegus dies in a duel with the (at that time) king Teia. The struggle for Rome ends in the battle of Mons Lactarius near Mount Vesuvius, where the Ostrogoths make their last stand defending a narrow pass (a scene reminiscent of the battle of Thermopylae) and, once defeated, are led back north to the island of Thule where their roots lie by a kindred Northern European people.

=== Literary context ===
The book recounts the struggle of the Ostrogoth state in Italy with the Eastern Roman Empire and describes their doom. The main motif of the book is stated in the poem at its end: Make way, you people, for our stride. | We are the last of the Goths. | We do not carry a crown with us, | We carry but a corpse. [ ... ]. This corpse belongs to their late and last king Teia who, throughout the story, symbolises the tragedy of his people's downfall from the moment of Theodoric the Great's death. During the reign of German emperor William II the book was interpreted as criticism on decadence and after World War I it was interpreted, in retrospect, as a prediction for the fall of the German Empire.

The novel focuses on the actual struggle for control over Ancient Rome and specifically on the acts of heroism and heroic deaths therein. For this fact it was quickly considered a novel for boys in the German Empire, newly founded in 1871; the book was continuously handed over from the previous generation of adolescents to the next until the 1940s.

Dahn was a trained historian and – prior to the novel – had published a first scientific monography about Procopius of Caesarea (in 1865), the main source of the Gothic War (535–552), describing the history of Theoderic's realm and people and their future fates. Dahn incorporated many historical details into the story. However, he was also able to create new characters if he felt the need for them, e.g. Cethegus.

=== Notable characters ===
The following groups are essential to the story.

==== Ostrogoths ====
The beginning of the story focusses on Theodoric the Great's envisioned heir, his grandson Athalaric. Being underage, his mother Amalasuntha reigns in his stead. When Athalaric dies prematurely, hope for a great leader à la Theodoric is lost. Amalasuntha envisions a merger with the Eastern Roman Empire, much to the dismay of the Ostrogothic people, who consider her as a traitor (an important motif throughout the book).

Theodoric's old but hardy armourer Hildebrand arranges an alliance to be made between him, Vitiges, Totila and Teia to save their kingdom. Vitiges is a just and mature man, who has to sacrifice his happy marriage with Rauthgundis to marry Amalasuntha's daughter Matasuntha. Totila is portrayed as a handsome and charismatic young man, who (like Theodoric) wishes to combine Roman civilisation with Gothic strength. This is symbolised in his relationship with the Italian Valeria. Teia is a dark and fatalistic war hero, who envisions the demise of the kingdom. Even though he knows this demise to be predestined, he adopts the Germanic philosophy to face fate with courage, in order to be well remembered. The reason for his pessimistic view lies also in a tragedy that cost the life of his fiancée. The nature of this tragedy is kept a secret throughout most of the book. As the story unravels each of these three men become king against their will, in their unsuccessful struggle to save the kingdom.

==== Eastern Romans ====
The Emperor's marshals Belisarius and Narses shape the campaigns for the reconquest of the Italian Peninsula. Belisarius has already conquered and destroyed the Vandals and is determined to bestow the same fate upon the Ostrogoths but fails to do so. Whereupon Narses, a shrewd strategist, does not waste the opportunity to subdue the Ostrogoths.

Throughout the military campaigns, historian Procopius is present to record the progression. He is in fact the main source of the Gothic War (535–552) and thus the main source for Felix Dahn to write this novel. Procopius' work Secret History is loosely interwoven as a subplot about Theodora scheming and cheating on Justinian I.

==== Western Romans ====
Cethegus, as opposed to most characters, is not a historical figure, but the patrician family to which he belongs is historical.

Cethegus was based on the life of Rufius Petronius Nicomachus Cethegus. His father, Petronius Probinus, used to be Consul (Roman consul) in 489 and Patricius (Patrician) from 511–12. In 504 Cethegus was elected sole Consul (e.g. without the obligatory 2nd person as his counterpart). From 512 – ca. 558 he was Patricius and active as a Magister officiorum and the chairman of the Senate (caput senatus, Senate of the Roman Republic). During King Totila's siege of Rome in 545 he was accused of treason and retreated to Constantinople. In 552/553 he negotiated with Pope Vigilius for Emperor Justinian I. Under Pope Pelagius I (556–561) he returned to Italy, making a home in Sicily.

In the novel he opposes both the Ostrogoths and the imperial Eastern Romans and strives to rebuild the Western Roman Empire, but never reveals his true motives to others, while plotting to achieve his goal and corrupting the relationship between the Ostrogoths and the Byzantines, except for his fellow conspirators. The conspirators are mainly members of patrician families that lost their influence under Gothic rule. Accordingly, they have names like Scaevola and Albinus. Another person of lesser importance is Pope Silverius, who is also involved in the conspiracy.

=== Film, TV or theatrical adaptations ===
The book has been turned into a movie titled The Last Roman. Starring amongst others Orson Welles, the film was directed by Robert Siodmak and originally published in two parts:

- Kampf um Rom I (1968)
- Kampf um Rom II – Der Verrat (1969)

==== Editions ====
- Dahn, Felix (1876–1877). Ein Kampf um Rom. Vol. (4 volumes). Leipzig: Breitkopf & Härtel. p. 1692.
- Dahn, Felix (1878). A Struggle for Rome — The Ostrogoths and Belisarius. trans. Lily Wolffsohn. London: Richard Bentley & Son. OCLC 36745149.
- Dahn, Felix (9 September 2005). A Struggle for Rome. trans. Herb Parker. Athena Press Ltd. ISBN 1-84401-444-4. OCLC 63393592.
- Ein Kampf um Rom (PDF; reprint of the 1888 edition in the Arno-Schmidt-Referenz library of GASL)

=== Sources ===
- Internet Movie Database
- Westenfelder, Frank (1989) [1987]. "II. Der historische Roman im Kaiserreich". Genese, Problematik und Wirkung nationalsozialistischer Literatur am Beispiel des historischen Romans zwischen 1890 und 1945 [original title: Entstehung, Entwicklung und Wirkung der nationalsozialistischen Ideologie zwischen 1890 und 1950 am Beispiel des "Massenmediums" historischer Roman]. Europäische Hochschulschriften. Reihe I, Deutsche Sprache und Literatur (in German). Frankfurt am Main: Peter Lang. ISBN 3-631-40732-7. OCLC 20871665.
- Ein Kampf um Rom in the context of conservative nationalistic literature (in German)
- "The German text". Gutenberg project. Archived from the original on October 19, 2002.
- The German text at buecherquelle.com
