= Amal dynasty =

Dynasty of the Goths

The Amali – also called Amals, Amalings or Amalungs – were a leading dynasty of the Goths, a Germanic people who confronted the Roman Empire during the fall of the Western Roman Empire. They eventually became the royal house of the Ostrogoths and founded the Ostrogothic Kingdom.

== Origin ==
The Amal clan was claimed to have descended from the divine. Jordanes writes:

Now the first of these heroes, as they themselves relate in their legends, was Gapt, who begat Hulmul. And Hulmul begat Augis; and Augis begat him who was called Amal, from whom the name of the Amali comes. Athal begat Achiulf and Oduulf. Now Achiulf begat Ansila and Ediulf, Vultuulf and Ermanaric.

This provides the following stemma for the earliest rulers of the Goths, before outlining in more detail the two divisions that arose from the son, Achiulf of Athal, the last in this early lineage:

Early rulers/kings
Gapt
Hulmul
Augis
Amal
Hisarnis
Ostrogotha
Hunuil
Athal

Gapt or Gaut is the Scandinavian god of war. Hulmul or Humli-Hulmul, is considered the divine father of the Danish people. Ermanaric (also referred to as Ermanaricus or Hermanaric), is identified as a Greuthungian king who ruled territories in modern Ukraine. Ermanaric signals the tenth generation, and the first generation to be backed by historical record.

== History ==
The origins of the Amal Dynasty are unclear. Until the mid-20th century there was a tendency to see the Tervingi and Greuthungi mentioned by Ammianus Marcellinus as having evolved into the Visigoths and Ostrogoths, respectively. The Greuthungi had become vassals of the Huns, and were considered to have regained their independence under the Amali Theodemir, father of Theoderic the Great. However, this idea has since been discredited by historians, who have emphasised the disruption caused by the Huns, as well as the similarity of groups previously treated as discrete ethnic groups.

A separate branch of the family were members of the Visigoths. Sigeric, a brief usurper to the Visigothic throne in 415, may have been a member of the Amali. The Visigothic Eutharic married Theoderic's daughter Amalasuntha, and is said to have been an Amal by Cassiodorus and Jordanes; however, it is more likely that this was a fictitious claim designed to bolster Athalaric's legitimacy. Jordanes states "Hermanaric, the son of Achiulf, begat Hunimund, and Hunimund begat Thorismud. Now Thorismud begat Beremud, Beremud begat Veteric, and Veteric likewise begat Eutharic."

The last attested member of the Amali house was Theodegisclus, son of Theodahad.

=== Amali rulers ===
- Ermanaric, King of the Greuthungi, c. 296–376
- Vinithar/Vithimir, King of the Greuthungi, c. 375–376
- Sigeric, King of the Visigoths, 415
- Valamir, King of the Ostrogoths, 447–469
- Theodemir, King of the Ostrogoths, 469–475
- Theoderic the Great, King of the Ostrogoths, 475–526
- Athalaric, King of the Ostrogoths, 526–534
- Amalasuintha, Queen Regnant of the Ostrogoths, 534–535
- Theodahad, King of the Ostrogoths, 534–536
- Theudigisel, King of the Visigoths, 548–549

== In literature ==
In the Nibelungenlied and some other medieval German epic poems, the followers of Dietrich von Bern are referred to as 'Amelungen'. In other cases, Amelung is reinterpreted as the name of one of Dietrich's ancestors. The Kaiserchronik also refers to Dietrich/Theoderic's family as the 'Amelungen', and in a letter of bishop Meinhard von Bamberg, as well as the Annals of Quedlinburg, 'Amulungum'/'Amelung' ("the Amelung") is used to refer to Dietrich himself. This shows that the family's legacy was remembered in oral tradition far into the Middle Ages, long after any stories about Amal himself had ceased to circulate.

Jordanes, possibly drawing upon Cassiodorus's Origo Gothica, describes the Goths moving to the Black Sea, where they split into two factions, the Amali, who would later become the Ostrogoths, and the Balti, who become the Visigoths. Both the Amali and the Balthi are recalled as families of "kings and heroes." However, Wolfram has argued that the tradition of the Amal was popular even before the time of Cassiodorus. This is shown in the naming of the royals, like Theodoric the Great's daughters, Ostrogotho and Amalasuintha, and his sister, Amalafrida, who were all given Amal names.

== Legacy ==
At least one prominent noble family claimed descent from Amali: the Billungs of the Duchy of Saxony.

== In popular culture ==
- The Amali appear as the "Amaling" dynasty in the grand strategy game Crusader Kings 2.

== Genealogy ==
Ermanaric king of Goths	HOUSE OF AMAL	Sigeric king of Visigoths
Thiudimir	Theodemir king of Ostrogoths ∞ Ereleuva	(daughter) ∞ Valamir king of Ostrogoths
Amalafrida ∞ 1.(unknown); 2.Thrasamund king of Vandals	Theoderic the Great king of Ostrogoths, Visigoths	Audofleda	Clovis I king of Franks; Merovingian dynasty
Amalaberga ∞ Hermanafrid king of Thuringii	(1?) Theodahad king of Ostrogoths ∞ Gudeliva	Amalasuintha ∞ 1.Traguilla; 2.Eutharic consul	Ostrogotho ∞ Sigismund king of Burgundians	∞ Anicius?	Justin I Roman Emperor	Vigilantia
(2) Athalaric king of Ostrogoths	(2) Mataswintha ∞ 1.Vitiges king of Ostrogoths	2.Germanus general	Justinian I Roman Emperor; Justinian dynasty

== See also ==
- List of kings of the Huns
- Balt dynasty
- The Origin and Deeds of the Goths (Getica)
- Vadamerca

== General and cited sources ==
- Bradley, Henry (December 2009). The Goths, from the Earliest Times to the End of the Gothic Dominion in Spain. General Books LLC. ISBN 978-1-150-60725-7.
- Jones, Arnold. Prosopography of the Later Roman Empire, Cambridge at the University Press, 1971.
- Jordanes (12 November 2013). The Origin and Deeds of the Goths. B & R Samizdat Express. p. 551. ISBN 978-1-4554-3671-2.
