= Eutharic =

Ostrogoth prince and Roman consul

Eutharic Cilliga (Latin: Eutharicus Cillica) was an Ostrogothic prince from Iberia who, during the early 6th century, served as Roman Consul and "son in weapons" (filius per arma) alongside the Byzantine emperor Justin I. He was the son-in-law and presumptive heir of the Ostrogoth king Theodoric the Great but died in AD 522 at the age of 42 before he could inherit Theodoric's title. Theodoric claimed that Eutharic was a descendant of the Gothic royal house of Amali, and it was intended that his marriage to Theodoric's daughter Amalasuintha would unite the Gothic kingdoms, establish Theodoric's dynasty and further strengthen the Gothic hold over Italy.

During his year of consulship in 519, relations with the Byzantine Empire flourished, and the Acacian schism between the Eastern and Western Christian churches was ended. Whilst Eutharic was nominally a statesman, politician and soldier of the Roman Empire, he was also an Arian, whose views clashed with the Catholic majority; as consul enforcing Theodoric's tolerant policy towards the Jewish people, he incurred resentment from the local Catholics, whose traditions were less than tolerant. Following disturbances in Ravenna, where Catholics burnt down a number of synagogues, Eutharic's siding with the Jewish people of Ravenna was reported with resentment in a fragmentary contemporary chronicle.

Some time after the death of Eutharic, his son Athalaric briefly held the Ostrogothic throne but died at the age of 18. After Athalaric's death, Eutharic's widow remained in Italy until her death at the hands of her cousin Theodahad in 535.

== Early life ==
Eutharic was born around AD 480 to a noble Ostrogoth family of the Amali line. Eutharic's ancestry has been traced back through his father Veteric, son of Berismund, son of Thorismund, son of Hunimund, son of Hermanaric, son of Achiulf. Eutharic grew up in Iberia (modern-day Spain) where he had a reputation for being "a young man strong in wisdom and valor and health of body". He was later to become the "son in arms" (filius per arma) to the Byzantine emperor Justin I, a role which indicated a part of his early life may have been spent as a soldier.

Eutharic's status in both the Gothic and Roman world was elevated by the attentions of Theodoric the Great to whom he was related distantly through their mutual connection with Hermanric. Hermanric was an Ostrogoth chief who ruled much of the territory north of the Black Sea. Eutharic was descended through five generations from Hermanric, whilst Theodoric was a descendant of Hermanric's older brother Vultwulf.

By the late 5th century, Theodoric was king of the Ostrogoths, ruling from Ravenna in Italy and a close ally of the Roman Emperor Zeno. Following the death of a rival, Theodoric Strabo, Theodoric the Great received the titles of patricius and magister militum from Zeno and in 484, he was appointed consul. Though there was tension between Theodoric and Zeno's successor Anastasius I, the emperor who followed Anastasius, Justin I, sought reconciliation with Theodoric whose influence in the Gothic world would make him a powerful ally. Having worked throughout his life to establish a kingdom and strengthen relations with both the church and Rome, Theodoric was keen to establish a dynasty. His marriage to Audofleda, however, had produced only a daughter, Amalasuintha. Therefore, to achieve his ambitions, Theodoric would have to ensure he chose a son-in-law with an ancestry equal in strength to his own. His investigations into the Gothic royal lines, which were by this time widely distributed across Europe, led him to Iberia. Here he discovered Eutharic, the last heir of a related branch of the Amali, who had recently assumed the regency of Spain.

More recent studies, however, suggest that Eutharic's Amali ancestry may have been a deliberate invention on the part of Theodoric to aid his ambitions of establishing dynastic credibility. According to Gesta Theoderici Eutharic belonged to the Gothic house of Alan rather than the house of Amal. Whilst Jordanes, in his history of the Goths, does make reference to Eutharic's prudentia et virtus, or pride and valour, this too may have been a fabrication on the part of Theodoric. Those qualities were recognised as requirements of Gothic ethnographic ideology, expressed in their code of civilitas. It would have been highly beneficial for Theodoric's chosen son-in-law to possess them.

== At the court of Theodoric ==
In AD 515, Eutharic answered a summons by Theodoric the Great and moved to the Ostrogothic court at Ravenna. Here, he was given Amalasuintha in marriage. It was Theodoric's intention that this union would create a long-lasting dynastic connection between the previously sundered Ostrogoths and Visigoths. Theodoric also named Eutharic his presumptive heir.

Whilst in Italy, Eutharic played an important political role within Theodoric's kingdom. With a court background he had the ability to serve in government and he was respected by the Romans, who admired his liberality and magnificence. Catholic writers of the time, however, indicate that, whilst his father-in-law was renowned for policies of toleration, Eutharic acted more like a "bigoted Arian".

== Consulship ==
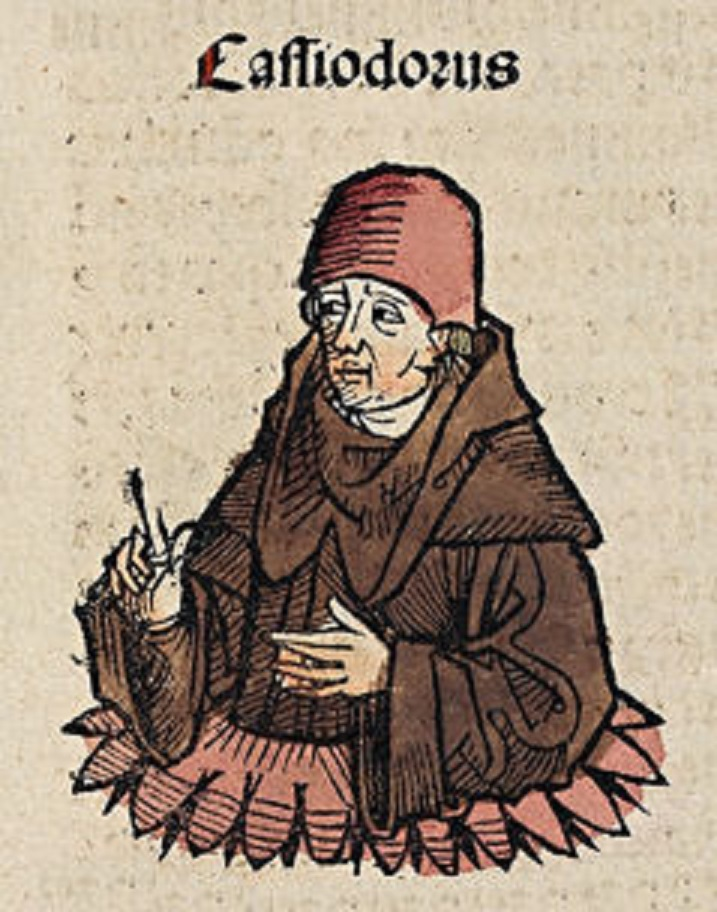
Cassiodorus (Woodcut from the Nuremberg Chronicle, 1493).

In 498, as the Empire's nominal vice-regent in Italy, Theodoric had been granted the right to nominate the Western candidate for each year's consular pair. He was, however, bound by a restriction: to select only a Roman citizen for the position. To advance Eutharic's standing in the world, Theodoric wished him to be made consul for the year 519. To get around the restriction and as a favour to Theodoric, Justin himself nominated Eutharic.

The nomination was successful, and in January 519, Eutharic took up the position of Western Consul. By granting him Roman citizenship, accepting him as co-consul and calling him a "son in arms", Emperor Justin I sought to restore ties with Theodoric, strained during the reign of Anastasius I Dicorus. He showed further favour to Eutharic by conceding the senior consulship to him. It is reported that at the celebrations to mark the assumption there were "magnificent shows of wild beasts procured from Africa" and that a visiting diplomat, the patricius Symmachus, sent by the eastern Imperial court to Italy, was "amazed at the riches given to the Goths and the Romans".

During this period, Eutharic was eulogised by Cassiodorus in the Senate. In it he compared Eutharic to great consuls of the past. The short Chronicle, which Cassiodorus wrote to congratulate Eutharic on his consulship, is noted for focusing on Eutharic's accession to a position of high civilian honour, rather than any military victories, as had been more common for past Gothic nobility. Eutharic's time as consul is portrayed largely as a time of prosperity for the western Roman empire with the code of civilitas being promoted. In March 519, the Acacian schism, which had separated the Eastern and Western Christian churches for the previous 35 years, was ended and the churches reconciled. In addition to the prosperity felt by the peoples of the Roman empire, Eutharic's year of consulship has also been described as seeming like "[a year] of bright promise for the Ostrogothic kingdom".

The contemporary Catholic chronicle of the Anonymus Valesianus portrays Eutharic in a negative light, charging him with taking the Jews' side in anti-Jewish disturbances in Ravenna over the Jewish congregation's rights to their synagogue; this prompted a conflict between the Arians and Catholics, as Eutharic was Arian. It is thought that the outrage expressed by the Catholics at this action was prompted by the perception that Eutharic symbolized the recent reconciliation between the Eastern and Western Churches brought about under the direction of Theodoric.

== Death and legacy ==
Eutharic died in 522 at the age of 42, less than three years after his consulship. His death caused problems for Theodoric who never succeeded in his desire to establish a strong Gothic dynasty. Though Eutharic and Amalasuintha had a son, Athalaric, born in 516, and a daughter, Matasuntha, the dynasty was never established convincingly. Theodoric named Athalaric as his heir in 526, and Athalaric's mother, Amalasuintha, acted as regent for her son following Theodoric's death that year. Athalaric died in October 534 at the age of 18. To maintain her power, Amalasuintha brought her cousin Theodahad, also Theodoric's nephew, to the throne. Though he was made to swear fealty to Amalasuintha, Theodahad felt insecure and in December 534 had her imprisoned on an island in Lake Bolsena where she was eventually murdered on 30 April 535.

== Sources ==
=== Primary ===
- Cassiodorus, Variae tr. Barnish, S.J.B. (1992). The variae of Magnus Aurelius Cassiodorus Senator: being documents of the Kingdom of the Ostrogoths in Italy. Liverpool University Press. ISBN 0-85323-436-1.

=== Secondary ===
- Amory, Patrick (1997). People and Identity in Ostrogothic Italy, 489–554. Cambridge: Cambridge University Press. ISBN 0-521-57151-0.
- Bachrach, Bernard S. (1973). A History of the Alans in the West from Their First Appearance in the Sources of Classical Antiquity through the Early Middle Ages. Minneapolis: University of Minnesota Press.
- Barker, John W. (1975). Justinian and the Later Roman Empire. University of Wisconsin Press. ISBN 0-299-03944-7.
- Bradley, Henry (2005). The Goths from the Earliest Times to the End of the Gothic Dominion in Spain (4th ed.). Kessinger. ISBN 1-4179-7084-7.
- Burns, Thomas S. (1984). A history of the Ostrogoths. Indiana University Press. ISBN 0-253-32831-4.
- Bury, John Bagnell (1958) [1923]. History of the Later Roman Empire: From the Death of Theodosius I to the Death of Justinian, Volume 1. Mineola, New York: Dover Publications. OCLC 41478187.
- Cristini, Marco (2018). "Eutarico Cillica successore di Teoderico". Aevum. 92 (2): 297–307.
- Evans, J.A.S. (2000). The age of Justinian: the circumstances of imperial power. Routledge. ISBN 0-415-23726-2.
- Gibbon, Edward (1827). The history of the decline and fall of the Roman Empire, Vol. 5. Kessinger Publishing. ISBN 1-4191-2419-6.
- Gillett, Andrew (2003). Envoys and political communication in the late antique West, 411–533. Cambridge University Press. ISBN 0-521-81349-2.
- Goetz, Werner; Jarnut, Jorg; Pohl, Walter, eds. (2003). Regna and Gentes: The Relationship Between Late Antique and Early Medieval Peoples and Kingdoms in the Transformation of the Roman World. Brill Academic. ISBN 90-04-12524-8.
- Goffart, Walter (2006). Barbarian tides: the migration age and the later Roman Empire. University of Pennsylvania Press. ISBN 0-8122-3939-3.
- Heather, Peter (1996). The Goths. Blackwell. ISBN 0-631-16536-3.
- Hodgkin, Thomas (1891). Theodoric the Great. New York: AMS Press. ISBN 0-404-58267-2.
- Jordanes, Getica tr. Mierow, Charles (2007). The Origin and Deeds of the Goths. Dodo Press. ISBN 978-1-4065-4667-5.
- O'Donnell, James J. (1979). Cassiodorus. University of California Press.
- Theuws, Frans; Nelson, Janet L., eds. (2000). Rituals of power: from late antiquity to the early Middle Ages. Leiden. ISBN 90-04-10902-1.
- Wolfram, Herwig (1988). History of the Goths. tr. Thomas J. Dunlap. Berkeley: University of California Press. ISBN 0-520-06983-8.

| Preceded by Anastasius Paulus Probus; Moschianus Probus Magnus, Post consulatum Agapiti (West) | Roman consul 519 with Iustinus Augustus I | Succeeded by Rusticius, Vitalianus |
