= Mataswintha =

Ostrogoth queen consort from 536 to 540

Queen consort of the Ostrogoths
- Tenure: 536–540
- Born: 518
- Spouse: Vitiges; Germanus
- Issue: Germanus
- House: Amali
- Father: Eutharic
- Mother: Amalasuintha

Mataswintha, also spelled Matasuintha, Matasuentha, Mathesuentha, Matasvintha, or Matasuntha, (fl. 550) was a daughter of Eutharic and Amalasuintha. She was a sister of Athalaric, King of the Ostrogoths. Their maternal grandparents were Theodoric the Great and Audofleda.

== Jordanes' narrative ==
According to the Getica by Jordanes,

"Eutharic, who married Amalasuentha...begat Athalaric and Mathesuentha. Athalaric died in the years of his childhood, and Mathesuentha married Vitiges, to whom she bore no child. Both of them were taken together by Belisarius to Constantinople. When Vitiges passed from human affairs, Germanus the patrician, a cousin of the Emperor Justinian, took Mathesuentha in marriage and made her a Patrician Ordinary. And of her he begat a son, also called Germanus. But upon the death of Germanus, she determined to remain a widow."

== Forced marriage ==
According to Patrick Amory, she was forced to marry Vitiges after her mother and her cousin Theodahadus were murdered.

== Son ==
Her son Germanus was born following the death of his father (late 550/early 551). Nothing further is known of him with certainty, although he can possibly be identified with the patricius Germanus, a leading senator in the reign of Emperor Maurice (r. 582–602). Germanus' daughter married Maurice's eldest son, Theodosius. Michael Whitby identifies the younger Germanus with Germanus, a son-in-law of Tiberius II Constantine and Ino Anastasia.

== In fiction ==
Mataswintha is the subject of an opera by Xaver Scharwenka, composed in 1891 and 1892, and premiered in 1894. Georgine von Januschofsky sang the title role in 1897. She was portrayed by Harriet Andersson in the 1968 film The Last Roman. As "Mathaswentha", she appears as a character in the time-travel novel Lest Darkness Fall, by L. Sprague de Camp, where Wittigis tries to force her to marry him.

== Bibliography ==
- Enßlin, Wilhelm: Matasuntha (in German). In: Realencyclopädie der classischen Altertumswissenschaft (RE). Vol. XIV,2, Stuttgart, 1930, col. 2180.
- Hartmann, Martina (2009). Die Königin im frühen Mittelalter (in German). Stuttgart: Kohlhammer, ISBN 978-3-17-018473-2, pp. 34–36.
- Krautschick, Stefan (2001), "Matasuntha", Reallexikon der Germanischen Altertumskunde, vol. 19, pp. 432–433
- Martindale, John R., ed. (1980). The Prosopography of the Later Roman Empire: Volume II, AD 395–527. Cambridge: Cambridge University Press. ISBN 0-521-20159-4.
- Martindale, John R., ed. (1992). The Prosopography of the Later Roman Empire: Volume III, AD 527–641. Cambridge: Cambridge University Press. ISBN 0-521-20160-8.
- Whitby, Michael. (1988), The Emperor Maurice and his historian: Theophylact Simocatta on Persian and Balkan warfare, Oxford University Press, ISBN 0-19-822945-3
- Wirth, Gerhard [in German] (1993). "Matasuntha". Lexikon des Mittelalters, VI: Lukasbilder bis Plantagenêt (in German). Stuttgart and Weimar: J. B. Metzler. col. 375. ISBN 3-7608-8906-9.
- Wolfram, Herwig (2009). "Matasunta". Dizionario Biografico degli Italiani (in Italian). Vol. 72: Massimo–Mechetti. Rome: Institute of the Italian Encyclopaedia. pp. 108–109. ISBN 978-88-12-00032-6.
