= Theodahad =

King of the Ostrogoths from 534 to 536

Theodahad 𐌸𐌷𐌹𐌿𐌳𐌰𐌷𐌰𐌳
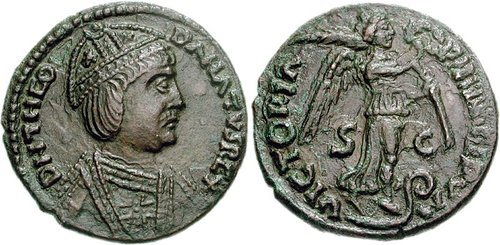
- Coin reading in Latin, "D[OMINUS] N[OSTER] THEODAHATUS REX / VICTORIA PRINCIPUM" ('Our lord Theodahad the King' / 'Victory of the Princes').

King of the Ostrogoths
- Reign: 534 – c. December 536
- Predecessor: Athalaric
- Successor: Vitiges
- Co-monarch: Amalasuintha (until 535)
- Born: c. 480; Tauresium, Eastern Roman Empire
- Died: December 536 (aged 56)
- Spouse: Gudeliva
- Issue: Theudigisel, Theodenantha
- Mother: Amalafrida

Theodahad, also known as Thiudahad (Latin: Flavius Theodahatus Rex, Theodahadus, Theodatus; c. 480 – December 536), initially ruled the Ostrogothic Kingdom jointly with his cousin Amalasuintha. She elevated him to co-monarch in late 534, following the death of her son, King Athalaric, likely seeking male support to legitimize her regency. However, seeking sole power, Theodahad betrayed Amalasuintha; he had her imprisoned and subsequently murdered around April 30, 535. His tenure as sole ruler proved short and tumultuous, ending with his deposition and death in December 536 while fleeing the forces of his successor, Witiges.

Theodahad's reign stands in stark contrast to the long and relatively stable rule of his uncle, Theodoric the Great, the kingdom's founder. Drawing on contemporary accounts (such as those by Procopius) and subsequent historical analysis, Theodahad's leadership is widely assessed as a disastrous failure. Key factors contributing to this view include his treacherous usurpation and murder of Amalasuintha—an act which provided Byzantine Emperor Justinian I with a direct pretext (casus belli) to launch the Gothic War—and his widely documented avarice, unpopularity with the Gothic nobility, and ineffective military leadership against the initial Byzantine invasion led by Belisarius. His failures ultimately precipitated a conflict that devastated Italy and led to the kingdom's destruction.

== Early life ==
Born around 480 in Tauresium (then in the Eastern Roman Empire, now in North Macedonia), Theodahad was the nephew of the Ostrogothic king Theodoric the Great. His mother, Amalafrida, was Theodoric's sister. Theodahad was the son of Amalafrida's first husband, whose identity remains unknown; her second marriage, to the Vandal king Thrasamund, occurred around 500. Theodahad's sister was Amalaberga.

Theodahad likely arrived in Italy during Theodoric's conquest (489–493), meaning he would have been a child or adolescent at the time. By his accession to the throne in 534, he was in his mid-fifties. According to historian Massimiliano Vitiello, the Gothic name "Theodahad" combines the elements þiuda ('people') and haþus ('conflict').

Sources indicate that Theodahad developed an interest in Plato (likely read in Latin translation) and Latin literature. He amassed significant wealth through large property acquisitions in Tuscany. Procopius, in his History of the Wars, notes that Theodahad sometimes used violent methods or encroachments against neighbours to expand his holdings. His land grabbing became notorious enough that Queen Amalasuintha (ruling as regent for her young son, Athalaric) compelled him to return properties. This action appears connected to diplomatic interactions involving Byzantine envoys, such as Peter the Patrician, sent by Emperor Justinian I.

Procopius further recounts that Amalasuintha communicated with Justinian, seeking support for her regency and likely addressing Theodahad's own secret negotiations with the emperor, in which Theodahad reportedly offered to cede Tuscany to the Byzantine Empire. Theodahad was married to Gudeliva, and according to Procopius, they had two known children: a son, Theudigisel (also spelled Theodegisclus), and a daughter, Theodenanthe.

== King and accession to the throne ==
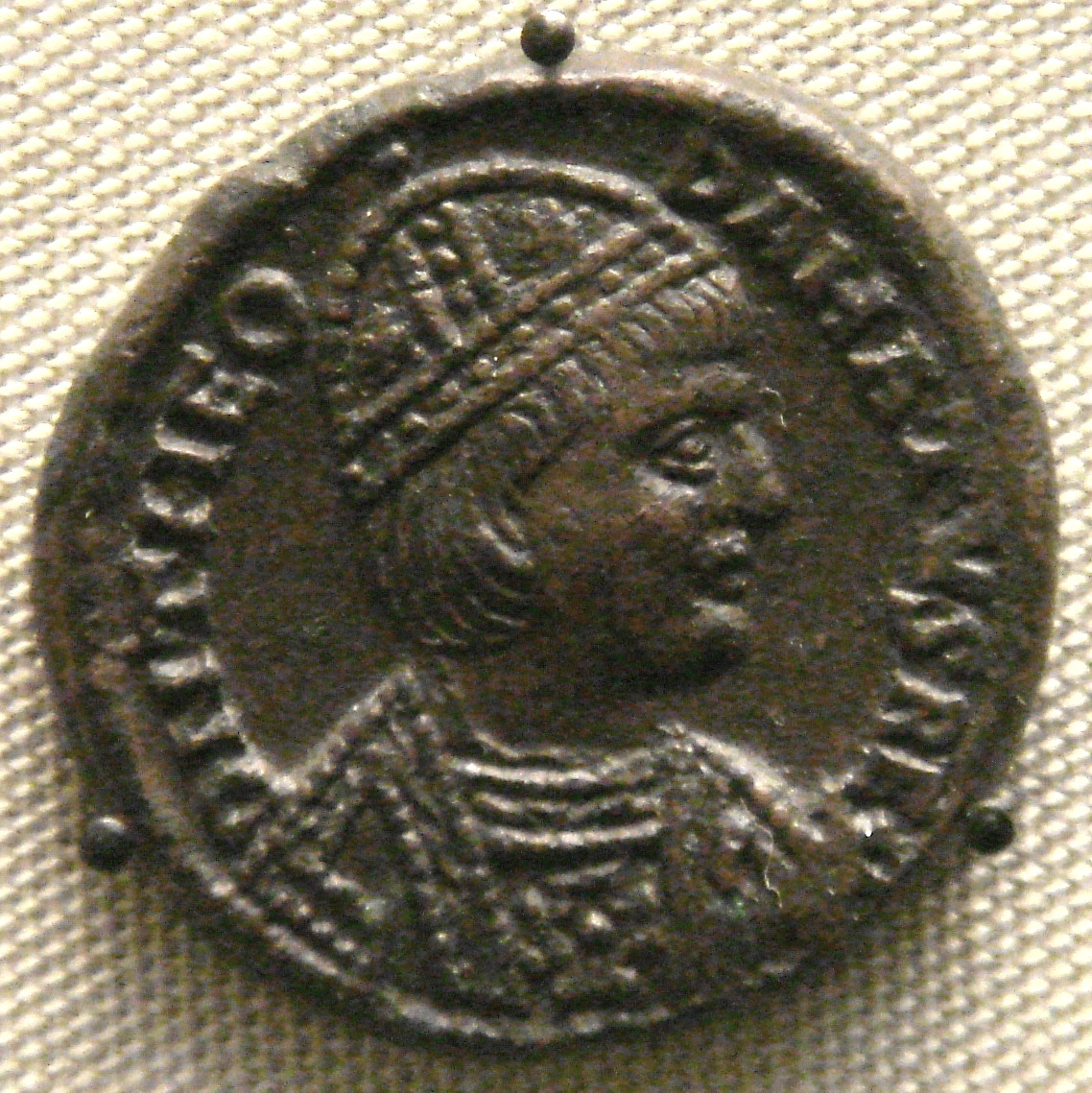
Coin of a bust of Theodahad

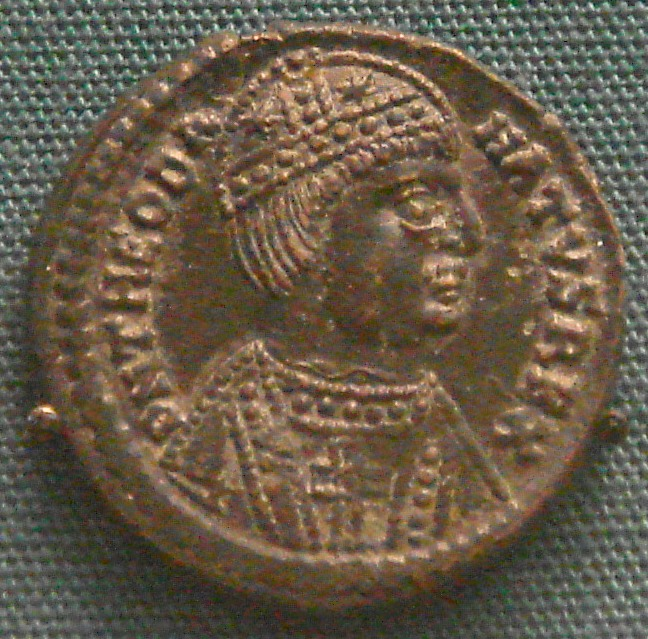
Another coin of Theodahad (534–536), minted in Rome. He is shown wearing a barbarian's moustache.

Although Theodahad was born into the Amal dynasty, the Ostrogothic royal family, historical sources indicate he was never considered the primary heir by his uncle, Theodoric the Great, whose succession plans centered on his grandson Athalaric. This assessment is supported by contemporary accounts highlighting Theodahad's scholarly interests over the martial prowess highly valued for leadership within Gothic society, evidenced notably by his lack of significant military experience. Contemporary sources, including Procopius, often portrayed Theodahad negatively, and modern scholarship generally concurs that his character and lack of military inclination made him ill-suited for the Ostrogothic throne.

Theodahad's cousin, Amalasuintha, initially ruled as regent for her young son Athalaric for a decade, and after his death in 534, she sought to rule as queen in her own right. Her pro-Byzantine political stance and her gender made her a target of opposition from many Ostrogothic nobles, leading her to execute some for alleged plots against her rule. To bolster her precarious position, Amalasuintha appointed Theodahad as co-monarch. Before accepting this appointment, Theodahad was required to swear an oath of loyalty to Amalasuintha, a move intended to secure her power and maintain her pro-Byzantine alignment, thereby indirectly associating Theodahad with Emperor Justinian I's sphere of influence.

Following earlier interventions where Amalasuintha had forced Theodahad to return lands controversially acquired in Tuscany, she later attempted to rehabilitate his reputation, urging the Roman Senate—a body still holding symbolic weight with the Roman populace and Constantinople—to recognize him as a capable landowner beneficial to the kingdom. However, these efforts largely failed to sway the Ostrogothic nobility. While Amalasuintha struggled to gain their support due to her gender and connections to Constantinople, Theodahad remained unpopular.

Amalasuintha also faced the challenge of preparing Theodahad for kingship, a role for which his uncle, Theodoric, had not groomed him. Theodahad's apparent lack of interest in learning governance suggested a reluctance to rule effectively. His life had largely focused on scholarship and acquiring wealth, particularly land, leading some historians to suggest that he may have contemplated retiring to Byzantine territory.

Resentful of Amalasuintha, particularly for having previously forced him to return unjustly acquired lands in Tuscany, Theodahad turned against his co-ruler. Soon after their joint ascension, he had her forcibly exiled to an island in Lake Bolsena near Orvieto. There, she was assassinated, likely strangled in her bath by relatives of men she had executed, an act widely believed to have been carried out with Theodahad's consent or direct order. In response to the murder of his ally, Emperor Justinian I initiated military actions, beginning with the invasion of Sicily, marking the start of the devastating Gothic War (535–554).

== Gothic War ==
Using the murder of the Ostrogothic queen Amalasuintha as a pretext, Emperor Justinian I initiated his campaign to reconquer Italy. His general Belisarius swiftly conquered Sicily in 535 as the first step in this effort to restore former Western territories to the authority of the Eastern Roman Empire. As Justinian prepared for a full invasion of mainland Italy following Sicily's conquest, Theodahad attempted secret negotiations with Justinian's envoy. Fearing war, he ultimately offered to abdicate and cede Italy in exchange for personal safety and wealth.

Justinian entrusted the main invasion of Italy to Belisarius, renowned as one of his most capable commanders, tasking him with conquering the peninsula from the Ostrogoths. However, Theodahad, known more for his interest in literature and wealth than for military skill, proved ill-prepared for war and struggled to organize against the Byzantine advance. An early setback occurred when Theodahad's son-in-law, Ebremud, sent south to confront the Byzantines, defected to Belisarius near Rhegium upon the approach of the imperial army.

While Belisarius besieged Naples in late 536, Theodahad remained largely inactive in Rome. His failure to relieve the city or mount a vigorous defense intensified dissatisfaction among the Goths, who contrasted his scholarly pursuits (including the study of Plato) with his perceived incompetence and cowardice in war. After Naples fell to Belisarius, the enraged Gothic army, gathered near Repta, deposed Theodahad and acclaimed Witiges, an experienced general from Theodoric the Great's time, as their new king.

Learning of this coup, Theodahad fled Rome, attempting to reach the safety of Ravenna. A Goth named Optaris, who reportedly held a personal grievance against Theodahad over interference regarding a woman he wished to marry, was sent by Wittiges in pursuit of the deposed king. Optaris captured and killed Theodahad, leaving Wittiges as undisputed ruler of the Ostrogoths.

== In fiction ==
Theodahad is a character in Felix Dahn's historical novel Ein Kampf um Rom (published in 1876), which was first translated into English by Lily Wolffsohn in 1878 as A Struggle for Rome. In Dahn's novel, Theodahad is portrayed as weak and subservient to his wife, Gothelinda, who is depicted as the true orchestrator of Amalasuintha's murder.

Theodahad also appears, under the name "Thiudahad", in L. Sprague de Camp's 1941 alternate history novel Lest Darkness Fall (which first appeared in novella form in 1939).

Regnal titles
Preceded by Amalasuntha	King of the Ostrogoths; 534–536	Succeeded by Witiges
