= Ostrogotho =

- Queen consort of the Burgundians
- Born: Ariadne c. 480
- Died: before 516
- Spouse: Sigismund of Burgundy
- Issue: Sigeric; Suavegotha
- House: Amali
- Father: Theodoric the Great

Ostrogotho (c. 480 – before 516) was the daughter of the Ostrogothic king Theodoric the Great, and the wife of the Burgundian king Sigismund.

== Life ==
Her mother is not mentioned by name. According to Jordanes, her mother was a concubine. According to Anonymus Valesianus, her mother was Theodoric's wife. Jordanes also mentions a sister Theudigotho. According to both, Ostrogotho was born while Theodoric was staying in Moesia (before 489).

Ostrogotho was probably baptized in Constantinople with the name Ariadne or Ariagne, named after Ariadne, the wife of emperor Zeno. In order to distinguish her from the empress, she was nicknamed Ostrogotho, and this nickname eventually superimposed her actual name.

Ostrogotho and her sister accompanied Theodoric on his campaign from Constantinople to Italy. During the fight against Odoacer, she was left by her father in Ticinum (Pavia). In 494, after Theodoric had consolidated his rule in Italy, he arranged the marriage of Ostrogotho with Sigismund, son of the Burgundian king Gundobad. From this marriage came a son Sigeric, and a daughter, Suavegotha. Suavegotha was later married to the Frankish king Theuderic I. The second wife of Sigismund, whom he had married after the death of Ostrogotho, convinced him that Sigeric was plotting to overthrow him. So, Sigeric was murdered by order of his father.

== Sources ==
- Helmut Castritius: Ostrogotho. In: Reallexikon der Germanischen Altertumskunde (RGA). 2. Auflage. Band 22, Walter de Gruyter, Berlin / New York 2003, ISBN 3-11-017351-4, S. 350.
- Felix Dahn: Ostrogotho. In: Allgemeine Deutsche Biographie (ADB). Band 24, Duncker & Humblot, Leipzig 1887, S. 528.
- Maria Assunta Nagl: Ostrogotho. In: Paulys Realencyclopädie der classischen Altertumswissenschaft (RE). Band XVIII,2, Stuttgart 1942, Sp. 1687 f.
