= Theodemir (Ostrogothic king) =

King of the Ostrogoths

Theodemir was King of the Ostrogoths and a member of the Amal Dynasty, and was the father of Theoderic the Great. He had two brothers-in-law named Valamir and Videmir. Theodemir was an Arian, while his wife Erelieva was a Catholic and took the Roman Christian name Eusebia upon her baptism. In the beginning of Theodemir's reign, he ruled together with his brothers-in-law as vassals under Attila the Hun, most likely settling for this arrangement after his older brother had only managed a rule lasting four years. He eventually consolidated the three Gothic regions in Pannonia under his rule after the death of Vidimir, and later inheriting the lands of the childless Valamir as well. He was married to Erelieva, with whom he had two children: Theoderic (454–526) and Amalafrida. In 461, after a demand for a hostage of noble Gothic blood was made by eastern Emperor Leo I, Theodemir submitted and sent his 7-year-old son Theodoric to Constantinople so he could receive a Roman styled education. In 469, a Roman imperial army was defeated and chased away from Pannonia; as a result, the emperor sent Theodemir’s son back to secure a new peace. In 471, Theodoric was declared co-King alongside his father for the next four years. Theodemir died in 475, and Theoderic fully succeeded him as king over a combined Ostrogothic Kingdom.

Preceded by Valamir	King of the Ostrogoths; 469–475	Succeeded by Theoderic the Great
