= Amalafrida =

Princess of Ostrogoths

Amalafrida (Gothic: 𐌰𐌼𐌰𐌻𐌰𐍆𐍂𐌹𐌳𐌰; before 475 – fl. 523) was queen of the Vandals by marriage to Thrasamund. She was the daughter of Theodemir, king of the Ostrogoths, and his wife Erelieva. She was the sister of Theodoric the Great, and mother of Theodahad, both of whom were kings of the Ostrogoths.

In 500, Theodoric, ruler over the Ostrogothic Kingdom in Italy, arranged a marriage alliance with Thrasamund, king of the Vandals in North Africa, in a series of marriage alliances with fellow barbarian kingdoms. Thrasamund became Amalfrida's second husband and she his second wife. She brought a very large dowry, as well as 1,000 Gothic elite warriors, 5,000 armed retainers and a contested area of Sicily.

After her husband Thrasamund's death, his successor Hilderic issued orders for the return of all the Catholic bishops from exile, and Boniface, a strenuous asserter of orthodoxy, bishop of the African Church. In response, Amalfrida headed a party of revolt; she fled to Carthage to her allies the Moors. Battle was joined at Capsa, about three hundred miles to the south of the capital Carthage, on the edge of the Libyan desert but she was defeated and captured.

In 523, after Amalafrida's party was beaten, Hilderic had her imprisoned under accusations of conspiracy and had her Gothic guards killed. She died in prison, exact date unknown, possibly under Hilderic's order. Her revolt and death are evident of Hilderic's pivot from favoring Ostrogoth to Byzantine diplomacy which contributed to his eventual usurpation. It also illustrates the problems that elite women faced in the Vandal kingdom due to their unique succession arrangements (that rulership should fall to eldest male descendent of Geiseric) as women's biological involvement in succession was severely limited and therefore also their influence at court.

Amalafrida had two children, the aforementioned Theodahad and Amalaberga, who married Hermanfrid, king of the Thuringii. It is not known who the father of these children was.

== Bibliography ==
- J.R. Martindale, The Prosopography of the Later Roman Empire, vol. 2, Cambridge 1980, pp. 63–64.
- M. Cristini, Il seguito ostrogoto di Amalafrida: confutazione di Procopio, Bellum Vandalicum 1.8.12, in «Klio», 99 (2017), pp. 278–289.
- Whelan, R. (2022), Missing Queens: Gender, Dynasty and Power in Vandal Africa. Gender & History, 34: 3-21
