= Amalasuintha =

Regent and queen regnant of the Ostrogoths

Amalasuitha 𐌰𐌼𐌰𐌻𐌰𐍃𐍅𐌹𐌽𐌸𐌰
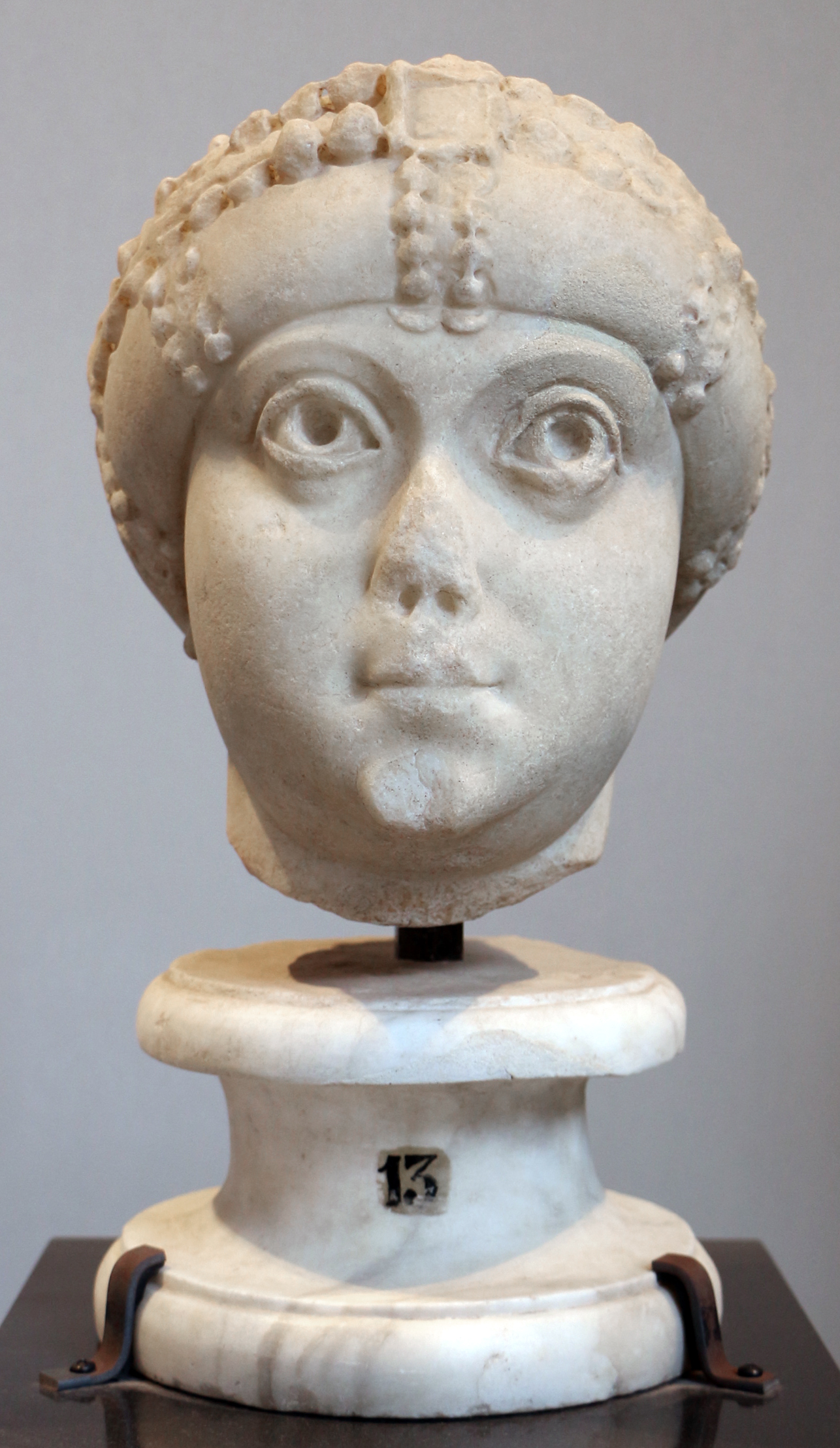
- Portrait head at the Palazzo dei Conservatori, assumed to depict Amalasuintha or Ariadne

Regent of the Ostrogoths
- Regency: 30 August 526 – 2 October 534
- Monarch: Athalaric

Queen regnant of the Ostrogoths
- Reign: 2 October 534 – 30 April 535
- Predecessor: Athalaric
- Successor: Theodahad (as sole monarch)
- Co-monarch: Theodahad
- Born: c. 495
- Died: 30 April 535 (aged 39–40)
- Spouse: Traguilla; Eutharic
- Issue: Athalaric; Matasuintha
- Dynasty: Amali
- Father: Theoderic the Great
- Mother: Audofleda
- Religion: Arianism

Amalasuintha (495 – 30 April 535) was a ruler of the Ostrogothic Kingdom from 526 to 535. Initially serving as regent for her son Athalaric, she became queen regnant after his premature death. Highly educated, Amalasuintha was praised by both Cassiodorus and Procopius for her wisdom and her ability to speak three languages (Greek, Gothic, and Latin). Her status as an independent female monarch and obvious affinity for Roman culture caused discontent among the Gothic nobles in her court, and she was deposed and killed after six months of sole rule. Eastern Roman Emperor Justinian I used her death as a casus belli to invade Italy, setting off the Gothic War.

== Family ==
Amalasuintha was likely born in Ravenna in 495, the only child of Theodoric and his wife Audofleda, the sister of Clovis, King of the Franks. The union of Amalasuintha's parents were of a political purpose, as many royal marriages were at the time. Theodoric married Audofleda about the year 493, after he had defeated the various Gothic kingdoms and sought an alliance with the Franks. Amalasuintha was born into the Amali dynasty on her father's side, which dynasty comprised Goths of Germanic descent. Like her father, Amalasuintha was married out of political reasons to Eutharic, an Amali prince, to ensure a legitimate heir to the throne. They had two children together, Athalaric and Matasuntha. Eutharic died in 522, causing Theodoric some alarm, as his kingdom lacked an adult male heir to inherit the throne. As Amalasuintha's son Athalaric was only 10 years old at the time of Theodoric's death, Amalasuintha took control of the kingdom alongside her son as regent and, although accounts by Cassiodorus and Procopius refer to Athalaric as King, she effectively ruled on his behalf.

== Rule ==
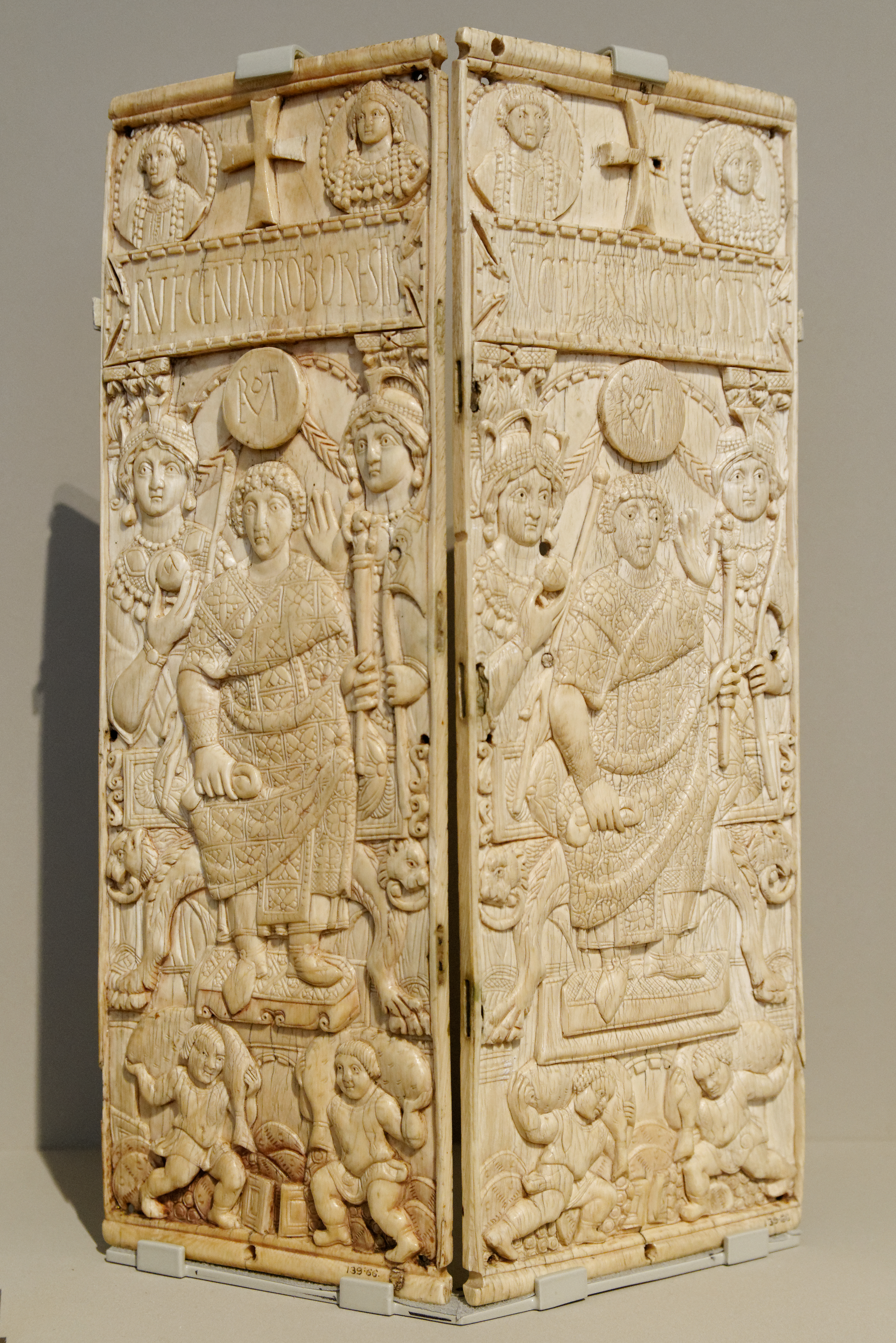
Consular diptych of Rufius Gennadius Probus Orestes, Victoria and Albert museum. Portraits of Amalasuintha and her son Athalaric are above the inscription, flanking the cross.

=== Regent ===
According to Procopius, the Goth aristocracy wanted Athalaric to be raised in the Gothic manner, but Amalasuintha wanted him to resemble the Roman princes. Amalasuintha had close ties to the Byzantine emperor Justinian I, which would have made her adherence to Roman learning and customs especially objectionable to her fellow Goths. The regency lasted until 534, when Athalaric died from what was most likely the combination of excessive drinking (a part of Gothic culture) and a disease, probably diabetes. In order to secure the power in the Amali name, Amalasuintha created the consortium regni that allowed her to continue to rule as queen while still presenting a public face that honored conservative Gothic tradition. She then appointed her older cousin Theodahad to rule as co-regent, in which Amalasuintha would play the male character and Theodahad would play the woman, as male and female monarchs sharing powers. Masculinity is the main characteristic attributed to Amalasuintha by Procopius and Cassiodorus, because she had a strong determination and temperament.

Her tremendous influence in her position as regent can be seen in a diptych of Rufius Gennadius Probus Orestes in which she appears alongside her son, Athalaric, in 530. Deeply imbued with the old Roman culture, she gave to her son's education a more refined and literary turn than suited her Goth subjects. Conscious of her unpopularity, she banished – and afterwards put to death – three Gothic nobles whom she suspected of conspiring against her rule. It was suggested by Amory, Heather and Heydemann that one of them was Tuluin (a powerful Gothic noble and general). At the same time, she opened negotiations with Justinian, with the view of removing herself and the Gothic treasure to Constantinople.

=== Queen regnant ===
After Athalaric's death, Amalasuintha became queen and ruled alone for a short while before making her cousin Theodahad co-ruler with the intent of strengthening her position. Theodahad was a prominent leader of the Gothic military aristocracy that opposed her pro-Roman stances, and Amalasuintha believed this duumvirate might make supporters from her harshest critics. Instead Theodahad fostered the disaffection of the Goths, and had Amalasuintha imprisoned on the island of Martana in Lake Bolsena.

== Death ==
While imprisoned by her co-regent Theodahad, Amalasuintha was murdered while bathing, on 30 April 535 according to Agnellus. Though historian Massimiliano Vitiello has instead suggested a date in May. The death of Amalasuintha was used by Justinian I as a reason to go to war with the Ostrogoths and attempt to reclaim Italy for the Eastern Roman Empire. According to the Eastern Roman historian Procopius, Amalasuintha was thinking about handing over Italy to Justinian around the time of her death. There is some evidence to suggest that the Byzantine Empress Theodora arranged to have Amalasuintha murdered, by conspiring with Theodahad through Justinian's ambassador Peter the Illyrian. Procopius believed that Theodora viewed Amalasuintha as a potential love rival and threat to her position as Empress. However, modern scholarship has contended that Theodora was acting on Justinian's behalf in arranging Amalasuintha's murder as it gave him clear justification to attack Theodahad.

In 536, Theodahad was deposed by Witigis, who had forcibly married Amalasuintha's daughter Matasuintha. With the people's support, Witigis had Theodahad put to death.

== Sources ==
The letters of Cassiodorus, chief minister and literary adviser of Amalasuintha, and the histories of Procopius and Jordanes, give us our chief information as to the character of Amalasuintha. Cassiodorus was a part of a greater pro-Roman party that desired to Romanize the traditional Ostrogothic kingship, further evidence of the pro-Roman circle that Amalasuintha surrounded herself with.

== Legacy ==
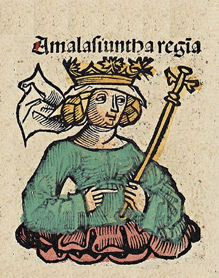
Amalasiuntha regina – woodcut from the Nuremberg Chronicle (1493)

=== Arts ===
The life of Amalasuintha was made the subject of a tragedy, the first play written by the young Carlo Goldoni and presented at Milan in 1733.

Romanian poet George Coșbuc wrote a poem entitled Regina Ostrogoților (The Queen of the Ostrogoths) in which Amalasuintha (as Amalasunda) speaks to Theodahad (mentioned as Teodat in the poem) shortly before he kills her.

Amalasuintha is portrayed by Honor Blackman in the 1968 film The Last Roman. Her character is suffocated to death in a locked bath house.

=== Eponymy ===
Asteroid 650 Amalasuntha is named in her honour. Ranunculus amalasuinthae is a microspecies of Ranunculus auricomus known from Pomerania, among others from a site situated not far from the cemetery of Goths near Grzybnica.

Regnal titles
Preceded by Athalaric	Queen of the Ostrogoths; 534–535	Succeeded by Theodahad
