= Theodoric the Great =

King of Italy from 493 to 526

Theodoric 𐌸𐌴𐌿𐌳𐌴𐍂𐌴𐌹𐌺𐍃
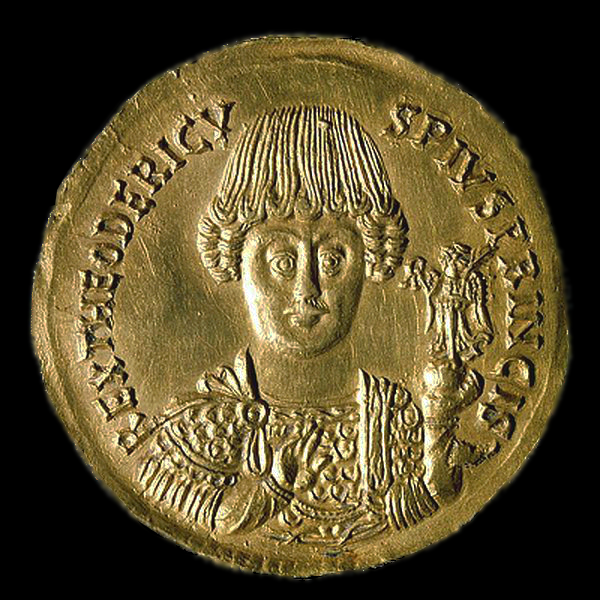
- Medallion (or triple solidus) featuring Theodoric, c. AD 491–501 (Note: Whether this is a coin at all or a medallion to be only worn around the neck is debated by historians, due to its weight, detail and thickness. The Late Latin inscription of REX THEODERICVS PIVS PRINCIS also confounds, with "princis" possibly meaning, "princ[eps] i[nvictus] s[emper]" (roughly, 'ever-unconquered leader'). This medallion/coin found in Morro d’Alba portrays Theodoric in Roman imperial costume, bearing traditional emblems such as the orb and Victory, yet retaina Gothic features like a mustache and long hair. Historian Hans-Ulrich Wiemer interprets this as propaganda that presents Theodoric as both a Roman-style ruler and a Gothic warlord, reinforcing his authority among both populations.)

King of the Ostrogoths
- Reign: 471 – 30 August 526
- Predecessor: Theodemir
- Successor: Athalaric

King of Italy
- Reign: 15 March 493 – 30 August 526
- Predecessor: Odoacer
- Successor: Athalaric

King of the Visigoths
- Reign: 511 – 30 August 526
- Predecessor: Gesalec
- Successor: Amalaric
- Born: c. 454 near Carnuntum (now in Lower Austria), Western Roman Empire
- Died: 30 August 526 (aged 71–72); Ravenna, Ostrogothic Kingdom
- Spouse: Unknown concubine; Audofleda
- Issue: Amalasuintha; Theodegotha; Ostrogotho
- Dynasty: Amali
- Father: Theodemir
- Mother: Ereleuva
- Religion: Arian Christianity

Theodoric (or Theoderic) the Great (about 454 – 30 August 526), also called the Amal, was king of the Ostrogoths (471–526), and ruler of the Ostrogothic Kingdom of Italy between 493 and 526, regent of the Visigoths (511–526), and a patrician of the Eastern Roman Empire. As ruler of the combined Gothic realms, Theodoric controlled an empire stretching from the Atlantic Ocean to the Adriatic Sea. Though Theodoric himself only used the title 'king' (rex), some scholars characterize him as a Western Roman emperor in all but name, (Note: See, for instance, Jonathan J. Arnold's Theoderic and the Roman Imperial Restoration (2014).) since he ruled a large part of the former Western Roman Empire. He also received and used the former Western imperial regalia from Constantinople in 497, and exercised imperial powers recognized in the East, such as naming consuls. The Italian aristocracy referred to him using the imperial title princeps.

As a young child of an Ostrogothic nobleman, Theodoric was taken as a hostage to Constantinople, where he spent his formative years and received an East Roman education (paideia). Theodoric returned to Pannonia around 470, and throughout the 470s he campaigned against the Sarmatians and competed for influence among the Goths of the Roman Balkans, gaining recognition as king in 471. The emperor Zeno made him commander of the Eastern Roman forces in 483 and consul in 484. Nevertheless, Theodoric remained in constant hostilities with the emperor and frequently raided East Roman territory.

At the behest of Zeno, in 489 Theodoric attacked Odoacer, the king of Italy, emerging victorious in 493. As the new ruler of Italy, he upheld a Roman legal administration and scholarly culture while promoting a major building program across Italy. In 505 he expanded into the Balkans, and by 511 he had brought the Visigothic Kingdom of Spain under his direct control and established hegemony over the Burgundian and Vandal kingdoms. Theodoric died in 526 and was buried in a grand mausoleum in Ravenna. He lived on as the figure Dietrich von Bern in Germanic heroic legend.

== Name ==
Theodoric's name was Gothic, and it is reconstructed by linguists as *Þiudareiks (*𐌸𐌹𐌿𐌳𐌰𐍂𐌴𐌹𐌺𐍃), meaning "people-king" or "ruler of the people". Contemporary sources give his name as Latin Flavius Theodericus (Ancient Greek: Φλαούιος Θευδέριχος, romanized: Phlaoúios Theudérikhos), although there were also many variants of the spelling.

== Youth and early exploits ==
According to the 6th-century writer Jordanes, Theodoric was born at the same time that the Ostrogoths defeated their previous overlords the Huns, after the death of their ruler Attila in 453. The Ostrogoths had already established themselves in Pannonia, south of the Danube, in an area which had been controlled by the Huns, and before that had been within the Roman empire. Modern scholars believe this defeat of the Huns probably occurred about 454. Jordanes says that the territory of Theodoric's father Theodemir was near "Lake Pelso" (Latin: lacus pelsois), which was either the Neusiedler See or Lake Balaton, which both lie near modern Vienna and Budapest. Theodemir was a member of the Amal dynasty, and Theodoric's mother was the king's concubine, Ereleuva. (Note: This claim stems from Jordanes, Getica 268–269 English, Latin) Historian Hans-Ulrich Wiemer states that, "Theodoric’s childhood was spent at a time of violent conflicts between non-Roman groups attempting to fill the power vacuum created by the collapse of Attila’s empire".

In 461, when Theodoric was seven or eight years of age, he was taken hostage in Constantinople to secure the Ostrogoths' compliance with a treaty Theodemir had concluded with the Augustus Leo I (ruled 457–474). Under the terms of the treaty, the Pannonian Goths were required to "surrender a hostage of royal descent" to the emperor's court; in this case that hostage was Theodoric. The treaty also secured a payment to Constantinople of some 300 pounds' worth of gold each year. Theodoric was well educated by Constantinople's best teachers. His status made him valuable, since the Amal family from which he came (as told by Theodoric), allegedly ruled half of all Goths since the third century. Historian Peter Heather argues that Theodoric's claims were likely self-aggrandizing propaganda and that the Amal dynasty was more limited than modern commentators presume. Until 469, Theodoric remained in Constantinople where he spent formative years—ten years in total—"catching up on all the Romanitas" it had taken generations of Visigothic Balthi to acquire. Theodoric was treated with favor by the emperor Leo I. He learned to read, write and perform arithmetic while in captivity in the Eastern Empire.

When Leo heard that his imperial army was retreating from the Goths near Pannonia, he sent Theodoric home with gifts and no promises of any commitments. (Note: Historian Herwig Wolfram suggests this gesture by Leo may have been taken to elevate the Pannonian Goths against his former general, the rebellious Aspar, who had joined up with the leader of the Thracian Goths, Theodoric Strabo.) On his return in 469/470, Theodoric assumed leadership over the Gothic regions previously ruled by his uncle, Valamir, while his father became king, ruling together. Not long afterwards near Singidunum (modern Belgrade) in upper Moesia, the Tisza Sarmatian king Babai had extended his authority at Constantinople's expense. Legitimizing his position as a warrior, Theodoric crossed the Danube with six thousand warriors, defeated the Sarmatians and killed Babai; this moment likely crystallized his position and marked the beginning of his kingship, despite not actually having yet assumed the throne. Perhaps to assert his authority as an Amali prince, Theodoric kept the conquered area of Singidunum for himself.

Throughout the 470s, sometimes in the name of the empire itself, Theodoric launched campaigns against potential Gothic rivals and other enemies of the Eastern Empire, which made him an important military and political figure. One of his chief rivals was the chieftain of the Thracian Goths Theodoric Strabo (Strabo means "the Squinter"), who had led a major revolt against the emperor Zeno. Finding common ground with the emperor, Theodoric was rewarded by Zeno and made commander of East Roman forces, while his people became foederati or federates of the Roman army. In 471, Theodoric was recognized as King of the Ostrogoths by 6,000 Goths that had previously rebelled against the Hunnic ruler Dengizich in 467–468.

Zeno attempted to play one Germanic chieftain against another and take advantage of an opportunity sometime in 476/477 when—after hearing demands from Theodoric for new lands since his people were facing a famine—he offered Theodoric Strabo the command once belonging to Theodoric. Enraged by this betrayal, Theodoric turned his wrath against the communities in the Rhodope Mountains, where his forces commandeered livestock and slaughtered peasants, sacked and burned Stobi in Macedonia and requisitioned supplies from the archbishop at Heraclea. Gothic plundering finally elicited a settlement from Zeno, but Theodoric initially refused any compromise. Theodoric sent one of his confidants, Sidimund, forward to Epidaurum for negotiations with Zeno. While the Roman envoy and Theodoric were negotiating, Zeno sent troops against some of Theodoric's wagons, which were under the protection of his able general Theodimund. Unaware of this treachery, Theodoric's Goths lost around 2,000 wagons and 5,000 of his people were taken captive.

Theodoric settled his people in Epirus in 479 with the help of his relative Sidimund. In 482, he raided Greece and sacked Larissa. Bad luck, rebellions and poor decisions left Zeno in an unfortunate position, (Note: One of the events comprising Zeno's bad luck was the untimely death of Theodoric Strabo in 481; he was thrown from a horse and impaled on a tent lance. Otherwise, contends Wolfram, Theodoric might not ever have become "the Great".) which subsequently led him to seek another agreement with Theodoric. In 483, Zeno made Theodoric magister militum praesentalis and consul designate in 484, whereby he commanded the Danubian provinces of Dacia Ripensis and Moesia Inferior as well as the adjacent regions.

== Reign ==
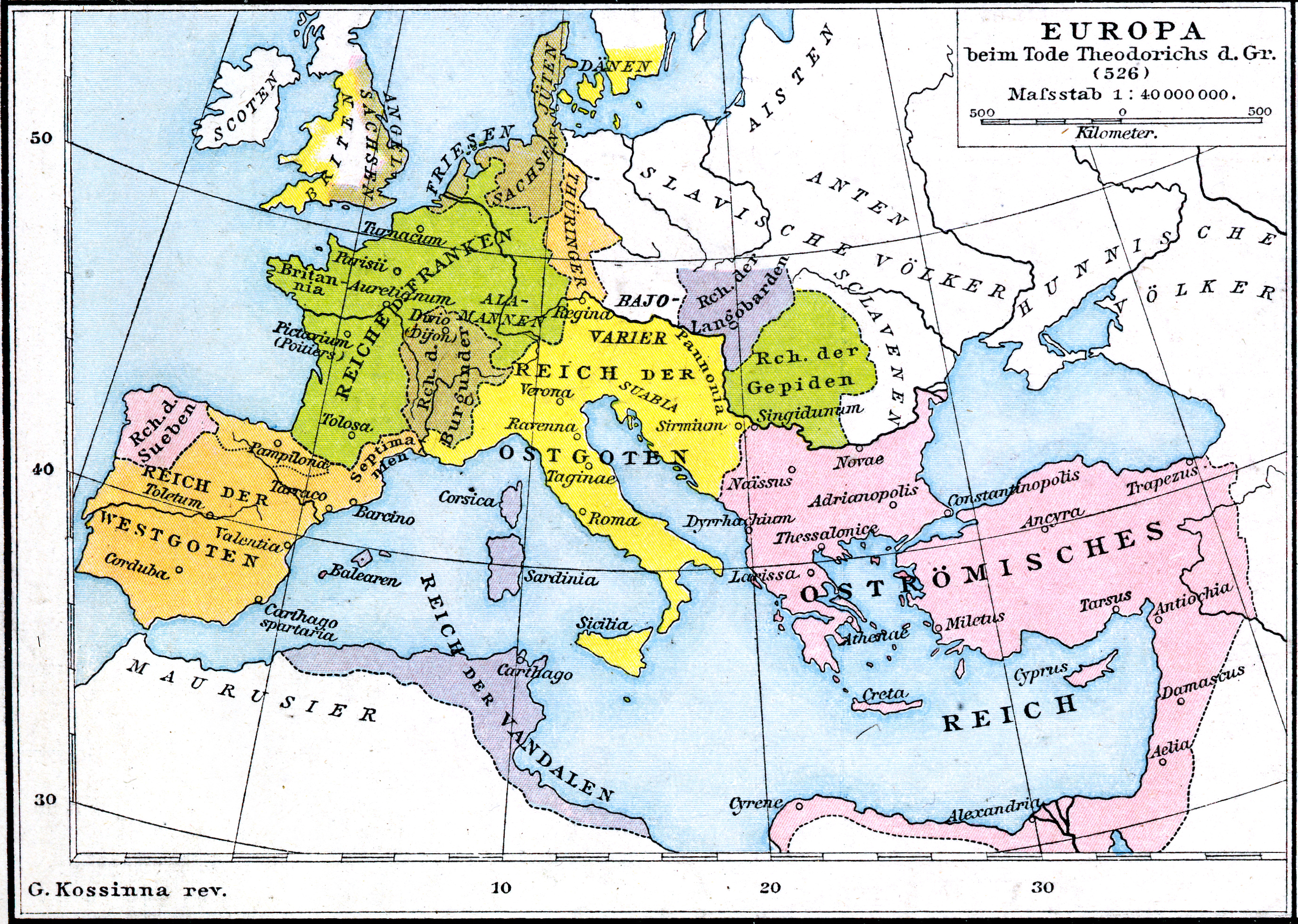
The Ostrogothic Kingdom (in yellow) at the death of Theodoric the Great (AD 526)

Seeking further gains, Theodoric frequently ravaged the provinces of the Eastern Roman Empire, eventually threatening Constantinople itself. By 486, there was little disputing the open hostilities between Theodoric and Zeno. The emperor sought the assistance of the Bulgars, who were likewise defeated by Theodoric. In 487, Theodoric began his aggressive campaign against Constantinople, blockading the city, occupying strategically important suburbs, and cutting off its water supply; although it seems Theodoric never intended to occupy the city, but instead to use the assault as a means of gaining power and prestige from the Eastern Empire.

The Ostrogoths needed a place to live and Zeno was having serious problems with Odoacer—the Germanic foederatus and King of Italy—who although ostensibly viceroy for Zeno, was menacing Byzantine territory and not respecting the rights of Roman citizens in Italy. In 488/489, Zeno ordered Theodoric to overthrow Odoacer, and the latter stopped issuing coins in the emperor's name and "raised his son Thela to the position of Caesar." For this task, Theodoric received support from Rugian king Frideric, the son of his cousin Giso. Theodoric then moved with his people towards Italy in the autumn of 488. On the way he was opposed by the Gepids, whom he defeated at Sirmium in August 489. Arriving in Italy, Theodoric won the battles of Isonzo and Verona in 489.

Once again, Theodoric was pressed by Zeno in 490 to attack Odoacer. Theodoric's army was defeated by Odoacer's forces at Faenza in 490, but regained the upper hand after securing victory in the Battle of the Adda River on 11 August 490. For several years, the armies of Odoacer and Theodoric vied for supremacy across the Italian peninsula. Theodoric besieged Odoacer in Ravenna until 2 February 493, when a treaty was signed making the kings joint rulers of Italy. Theodoric entered Ravenna on 5 March 493, and a banquet celebrating the treaty was organized on 15 March. At this feast, Theodoric, after making a toast, drew his sword and struck Odoacer, splitting him in two from collarbone to thigh. Theodoric had the king's most loyal followers slaughtered as well, making him the master of Italy.

With Odoacer dead and his forces dispersed, Theodoric now faced the problem of settlement for his people. Concerned about thinning out the Amal line too much, Theodoric believed he could not afford to spread some 40,000 of his tribesmen across the entire Italian peninsula. Such considerations led him to the conclusion that it was best to settle the Ostrogoths in three concentrated areas: around Pavia, Ravenna and Picenum. Theodoric's kingdom was among the most "Roman" of the barbarian states and he successfully ruled most of Italy for thirty-three years following his treachery against Odoacer. He visited Rome in 500 where he stayed for 6 months and held games in the Circus, probably also in the Colosseum, and renewed the grain largesse to the Roman populace, which had perhaps been interrupted since the days of Odoacer. (Note: Despite how "Roman" Theodoric comes across in the sources, Wiemer highlights the near-total absence of women in Gothic military migrations and settlements in Italy. This male-dominated warrior culture influenced Gothic identity and governance structures, with implications for lineage, social norms, and the composition of Theodoric's court. This aspect is rarely noted in traditional accounts of the period.) Theodoric's settlement policy involved granting Gothic warriors land in Italy through a modified version of the Roman hospitalitas system. According to Wiemer, this provided a means of rewarding Gothic loyalty while avoiding wholesale confiscation of Roman estates. However, it also entrenched social divisions and created enduring tensions.

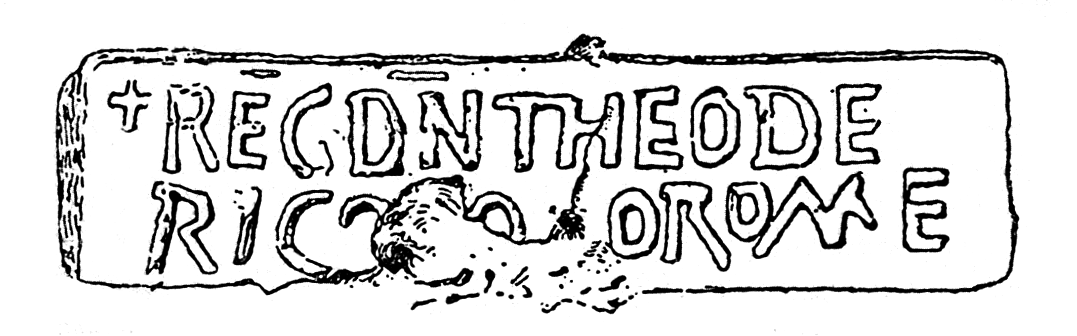
Brick with the emblem of Theodoric, found in the Temple of Vesta, Rome. It reads "+REG(nante) D(omino) N(ostro) THEODERICO [b]O[n]O ROM(a)E", which translates as With our master Theodoric the Good reigning in Rome [this brick was made].

Theodoric extended his hegemony over the Burgundian and Vandal kingdoms (along with Visigothic royals) through marriage alliances. He had married the sister of the mighty Frankish king, Clovis—likely in recognition of Frankish power. He sent a substantial dowry accompanied by a guard of 5,000 troops with his sister Amalafrida when she married the king of the Vandals and Alans, Thrasamund. These policies aimed to position Theodoric as the senior monarch among the western barbarian kings. In 504–505, Theodoric extended his realms in the Balkans by defeating the Gepids, acquiring the province of Pannonia. Theodoric became regent for the infant Visigothic king, his grandson Amalaric, following the defeat of Alaric II by the Franks under Clovis in 507. The Franks were able to wrest control of Aquitaine from the Visigoths, but otherwise Theodoric was able to defeat their incursions.

In 511, the Visigothic Kingdom was brought under Theodoric's direct control, forming a Gothic superstate that extended from the Atlantic to the Danube. While territories that were lost to the Franks remained that way, Theodoric concluded a peace arrangement with the heirs of the Frankish Kingdom once Clovis was dead. Additional evidence of the Gothic king's extensive royal reach include the acts of ecclesiastical councils that were held in Tarragona and Gerona; while both occurred in 516 and 517, they date back to the "regnal years of Theoderic, which seem to commence in the year 511".

Like Odoacer, Theodoric was ostensibly only a viceroy for the augustus in Constantinople, but he nonetheless adopted the trappings of imperial style, increasingly emphasizing his "neo-imperial status". According to historian Peter Brown, Theodoric was in the habit of commenting that "An able Goth wants to be like a Roman; only a poor Roman would want to be like a Goth." Much like the representatives of the Eastern Empire, Theodoric chose to be clad in robes dyed purple, emulating the imperial colors and perhaps even to reinforce the imperial dispatch of the augustus Anastasius I, which outlined Theodoric's position as an imperial colleague. Chroniclers like Cassiodorus added a layer of legitimacy for Theodoric and the Amal tribe from which he came by casting them as cooperative participants in the greater history of the Mediterranean dating back to the era of Alexander the Great. Though he did not adopt the title Imperator, Theodoric employed many of the ceremonial and symbolic forms associated with Roman emperors, including triumphal entries (adventus), and formal addresses to the people (adlocutio) of Rome. Wiemer argues that this ceremonial adoption of imperial norms served to legitimize Theodoric’s rule in the eyes of Roman elites. In reality—at least in part due to his formidable military—he was able to avoid imperial supervision, and dealings between the emperor and Theodoric were as equals. Unlike Odoacer, however, Theodoric respected the agreement he had made and allowed Roman citizens within his kingdom to be subject to Roman law and the Roman judicial system. The Goths, meanwhile, lived under their own laws and customs. Theodoric preserved legal distinctions between Goths and Romans by maintaining separate legal traditions. Roman subjects continued to be governed by Roman law, while Gothic military settlers operated under Gothic customary law. This legal bifurcation, according to Wiemer, was central to Theodoric’s vision of coexistence and order in his kingdom. Historian Hans-Ulrich Wiemer characterizes Theodoric's rule as based on a principle of “integration through separation,” whereby the Ostrogoths and the Roman population maintained distinct legal and cultural spheres. While Goths served primarily in military roles under their own legal codes, the Roman population continued to be governed by Roman law and staffed the civil administration. This dual structure allowed Theodoric to preserve ethnic identities while ensuring administrative stability in Italy. In 519, when a mob had burned down the synagogues of Ravenna, Theodoric ordered the town to rebuild them at its own expense.

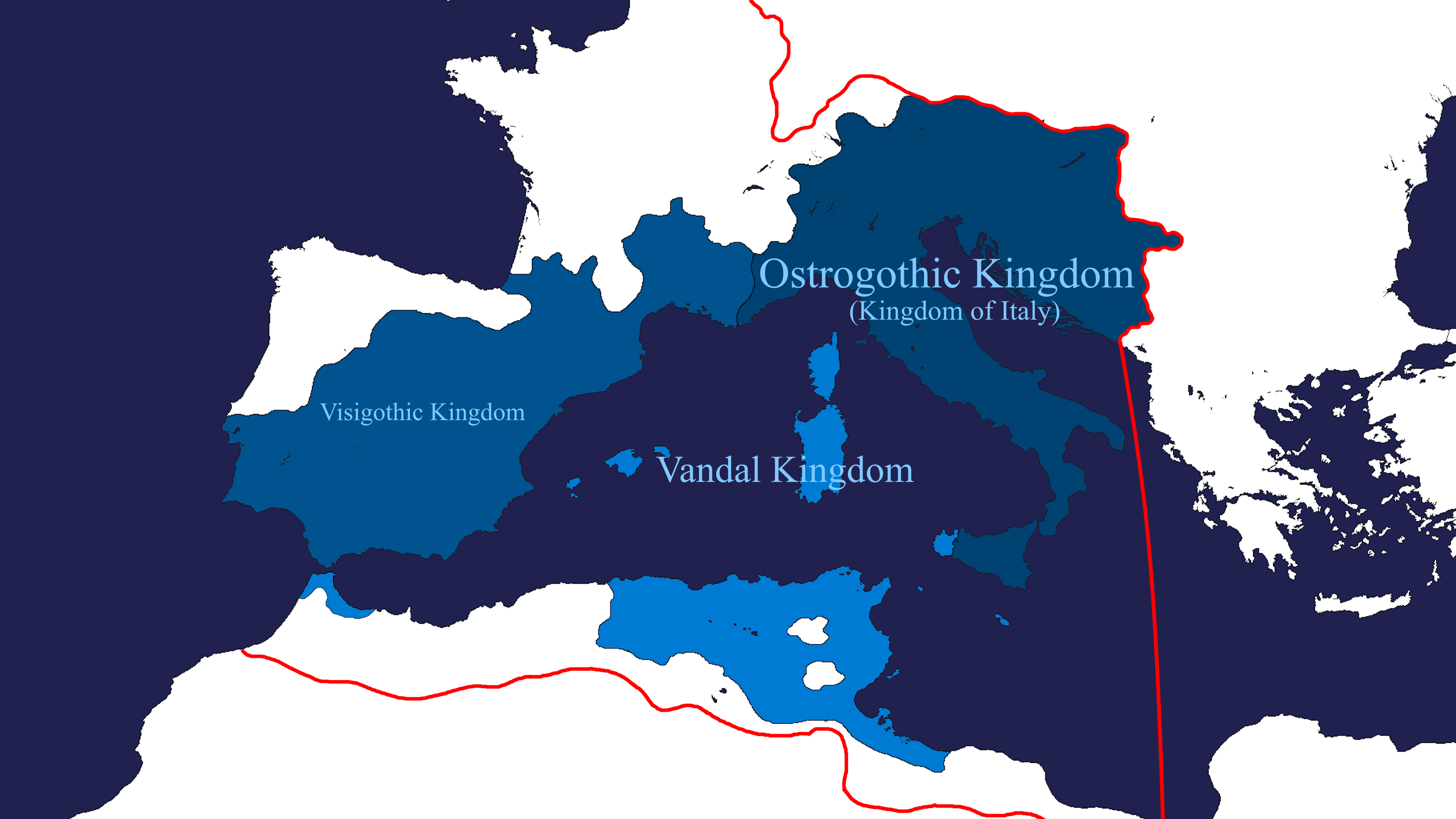
Theodoric's empire at the height of its power in 523, with territory marked in blue ruled directly by Theodoric and light blue areas under his hegemony

Theodoric experienced difficulties before his death. He had married off his daughter Amalasuintha to the Visigoth Eutharic, but Eutharic died in August 522 or 523, so no lasting dynastic connection of Ostrogoths and Visigoths was established, which highlighted the tensions between the Eastern Empire and the West. The new augustus, Justin I—who replaced Anastasius, a man with whom Theodoric had good relations—was under the influence of his nephew Justinian; somehow, imperial views hardened against the West and talk of Rome's fall emerged during this period, leading to questions about the legitimacy of barbarian rule.

Theodoric's good relations with the Roman Senate deteriorated due to a presumed senatorial conspiracy in 522, and, in 523, Theodoric had the philosopher and court official Boethius and Boethius's father-in-law Symmachus arrested on charges of treason related to the alleged plot. For his ostensible role, Theodoric had Boethius executed in 524. Although Theodoric initially promoted religious toleration between Arian Goths and Catholic Romans, tensions escalated in the final years of his reign. The arrest and execution of the Roman senator Boethius on charges of treason marked a turning point. In some ways, this event reflects Theodoric’s increasing political paranoia and declining trust in the Roman aristocracy. (Note: Historian Johannes Fried points out that no proof ever emerged that Boethius had committed a crime, but he was brought to his end by the mistrust of Theodoric, who Fried argues was guilty of misjudgment and likely "regretted" his actions.) (Note: Two years later (526) Symmachus was also put to death.)

Despite the complex relationship between Theodoric and his son-in-law, the Catholic Burgundian king Sigismund, the two enjoyed a mutual peace for fifteen years. Then in 522, Sigismund killed his own son—Theodoric's grandson—Sigeric; an act which infuriated Theodoric and he retaliated by invading the Burgundian kingdom, accompanied by the Franks. Between the two peoples, Sigismund's Burgundian forces faced two fronts and were defeated. Meanwhile, Sigismund's Arian brother Godomar established himself as king over the remaining Burgundian territory and ruled for a decade.

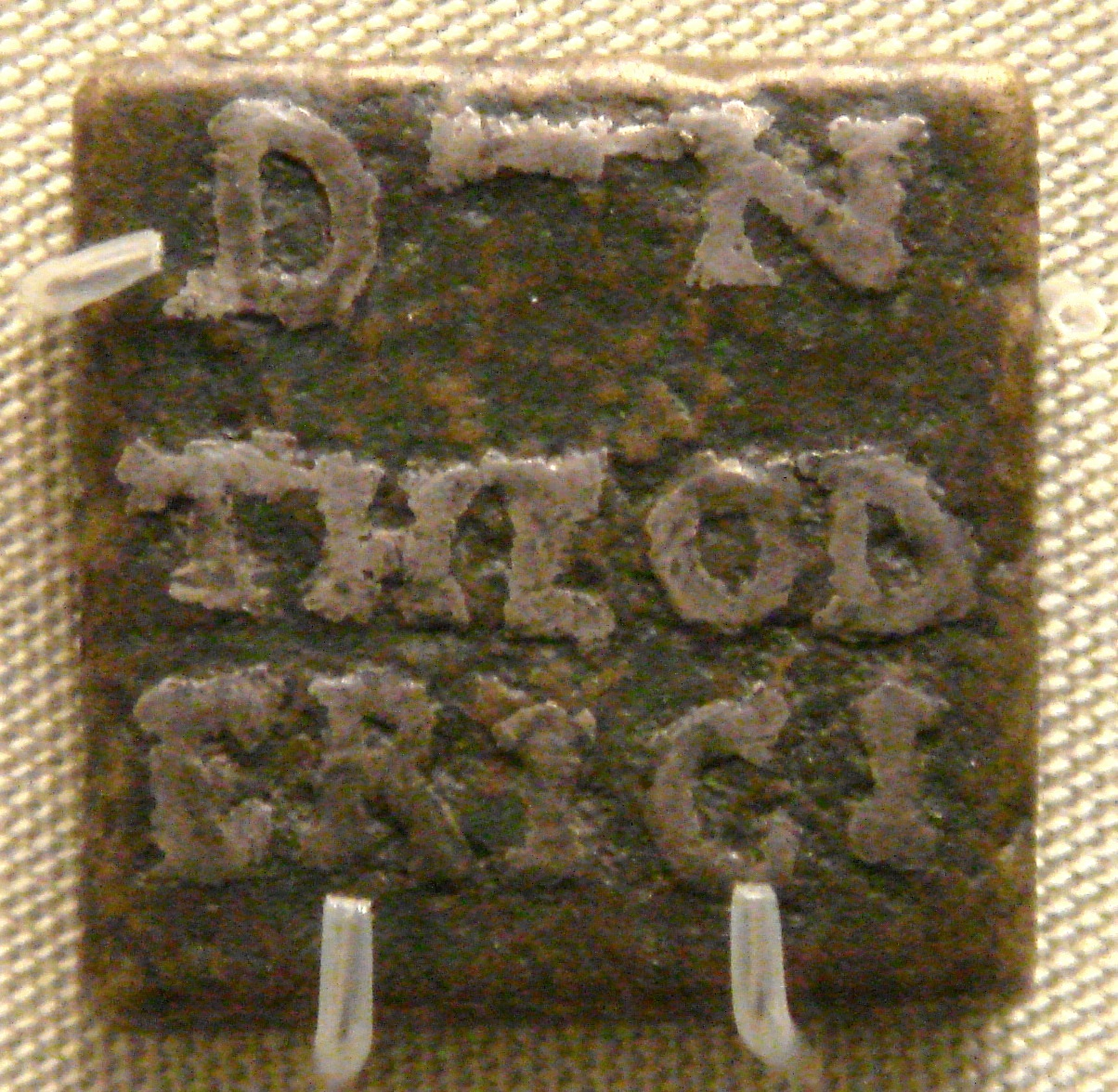
Bronze weight, inlaid with silver, with the name of Theodoric, issued by prefect Catulinus in Rome, 493–526

When Theodoric's sister Amalafrida sought to possibly change the direction of Vandal succession following the death of her spouse, the former Vandal king Thrasamund, the new Catholic Vandal king Hilderic had her, along with the accompanying Gothic retinue, killed. Theodoric was incensed and planned an expedition to restore his power over the Vandal kingdom when he died of dysentery in the summer of 526. (Note: The exact date is given as 30 August 526.) The Gothic king was succeeded by his grandson Athalaric, with Theodoric's daughter Amalasuintha serving as regent since Athalaric was but ten years of age when Theodoric died. Her role was to carry out the dead ruler's political testament, (Note: For a short period, Amalasuintha managed affairs for the Ostrogoths admirably, defeating Gepids and Heruli—who attempted to take Pannonia—in 530; she strengthened the relationship with the Burgundians by ceding lands north of Durance, appealed to Constantinople for political asylum when internal factions threatened her, and convinced her cousin Theodahad to make her co-ruler of the Gothic kingdoms before she was betrayed.) to seek accommodation with the senate, and maintain peace with the emperor. Suddenly the once united Goths were split and Theodoric's grandson Amalaric ruled the newly independent Visigothic kingdom for the next five years.

== Family and progeny ==
Theodoric was married once. He had a concubine in Moesia, name unknown, with whom he had two daughters:

- Ostrogotho (ca. 475 – 520). She was married to the king Sigismund of Burgundy as a part of her father's alliance with the Burgundians.
- Theodegotha (ca. 473 – ?). In 494, she was married to Alaric II as a part of her father's alliance with the Visigoths.

By his marriage in 493 to the pagan Audofleda—the sister of Clovis, who was baptized an Arian at the time of their wedding—Theodoric had one daughter:

- Amalasuintha, Queen of the Goths. She was married to Eutharic and had two children: Athalaric and Matasuntha (the latter being married to Witiges first, then, after Witiges's death, married to Germanus Justinus).

After his death in Ravenna in 526, Theodoric was succeeded by his grandson Athalaric. Athalaric was at first represented by his mother Amalasuintha, who served as regent between 534 and 535. The kingdom of the Ostrogoths, however, began to wane and the personal union of the Gothic tribes, once brought together by Theodoric, collapsed following his demise. The subsequent campaigns into Italy by Justinian—whose long reign from 527 to 565 delineates the transition from "antiquity to the Middle Ages in the Latin West" according to historian Michael Kulikowski—wrought the final blows to Theodoric's once dominant kingdom.

== Building program ==
Theodoric promoted the rebuilding of Roman cities and the preservation of ancient monuments in Italy. In 500, Rome itself was given special attention by Theodoric, who wanted to restore the structures previously damaged by time and the barbarians alike, since as he mused, Rome's great buildings were witness to its grandeur, power, and thereto instructed his architects to restore all that was "ancient". His preservation efforts were designed to elicit awe and admiration in future generations. The fame of Theodoric's building works reached far-away Syria. In the aggregate, Theodoric's building program saw more extensive new construction and restoration than that of any of the West Roman emperors after Honorius (395–423).

=== Ravenna ===
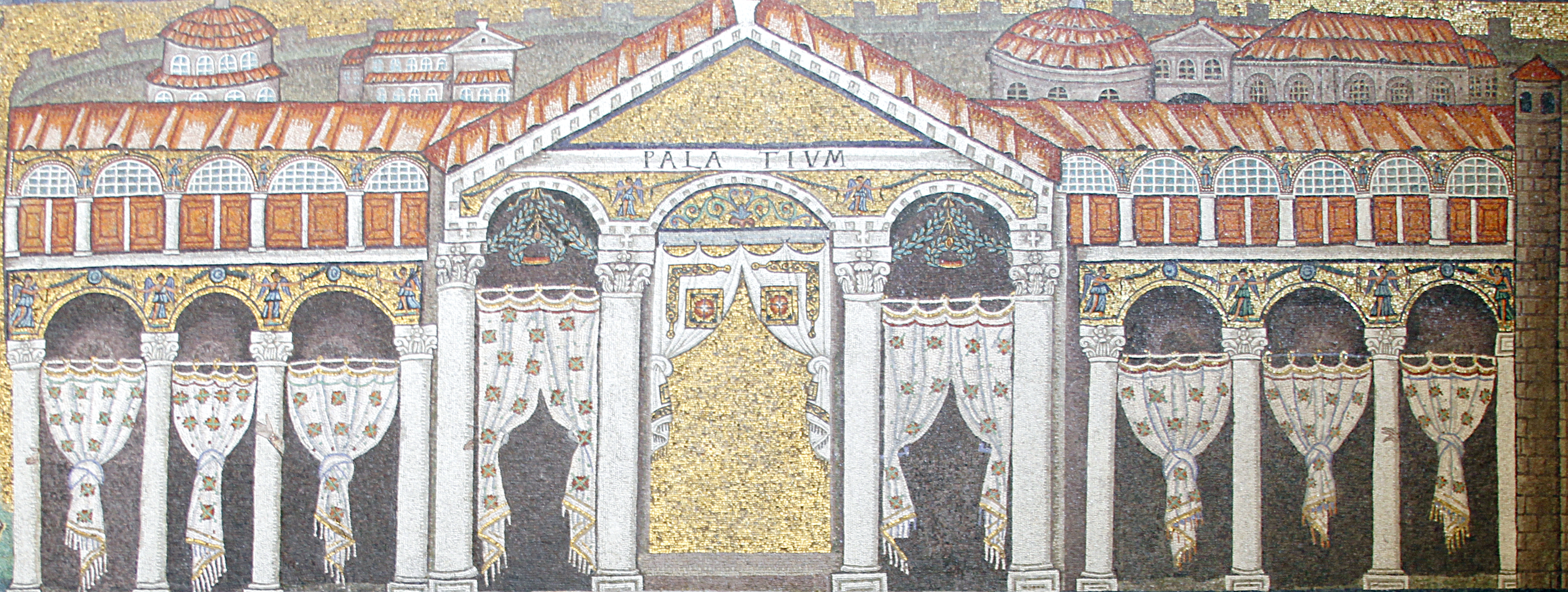
Mosaic depiction of the front of Theodoric's Palace on the upper part of the south wall of the nave of San Apollinare Nuovo in Ravenna. Theodoric and his court were removed from the image by the Eastern Romans.

Theodoric devoted most of his architectural attention to his capital, Ravenna. He restored Ravenna's water supply by repairing an aqueduct originally built by Trajan. According to the chronicles of Cassiodorus, a number of cities were renewed by Theodoric's building enterprises, some of which even surpassed the ancient wonders. Historian Jonathan J. Arnold quips:

Northern cities like Ravenna, Verona, Pavia, Milan, Parma, Como, Aquileia, and still others received new or improved walls, palaces, aqueducts, churches, baths, and a host of other impressive and glorious buildings, all reiterating to their respective inhabitants their own importance within a newly revived and reinvigorated Roman Empire and connecting such ideas with the intervention of a caring and devoted princeps, Theodoric.

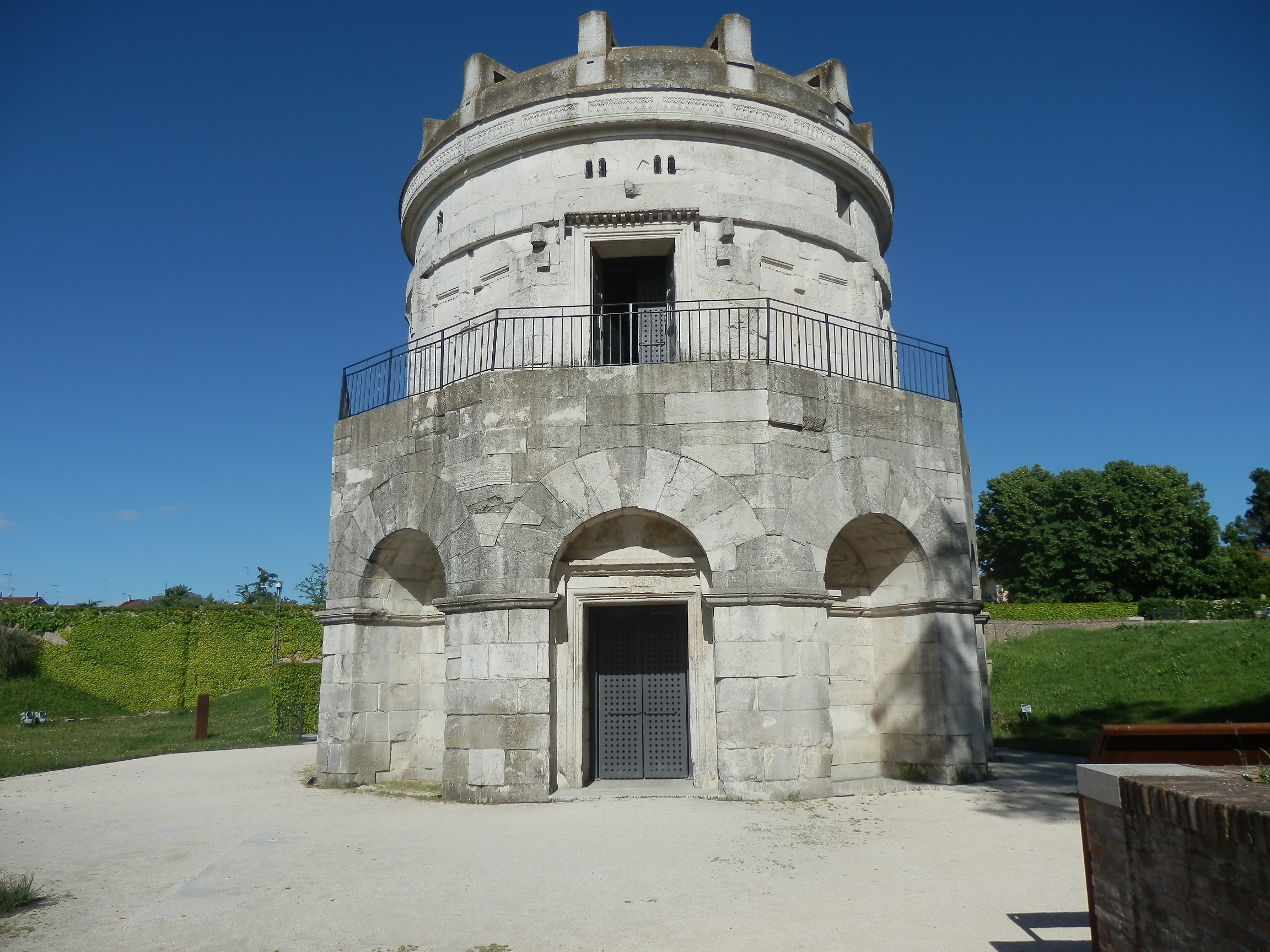
The Mausoleum of Theodoric in Ravenna

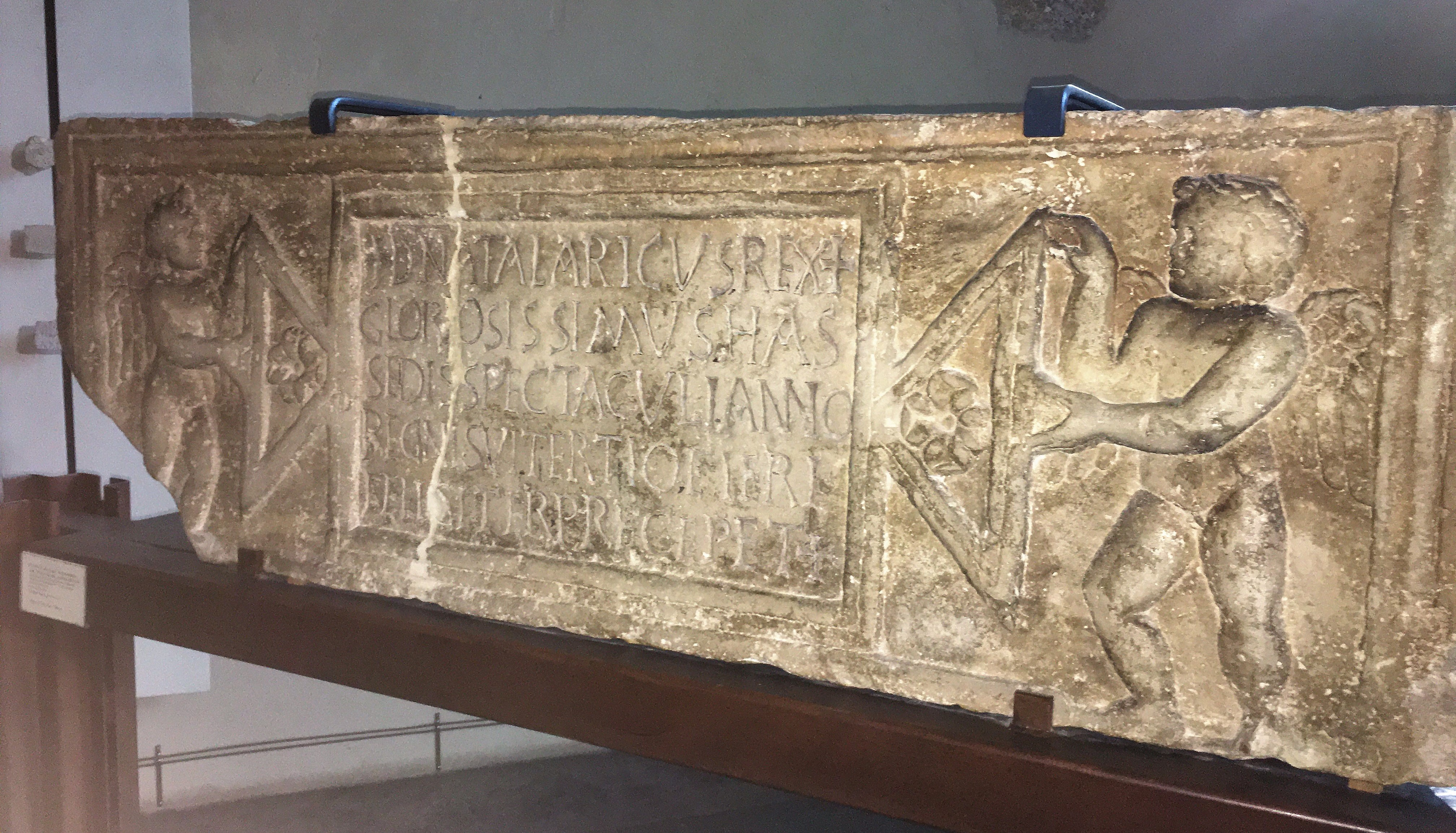
Epigraph originally placed at the amphitheater built in Pavia by Theodoric in which the restorations carried out between 528 and 529 by Athalaric are mentioned, Pavia Civic Museums.

He constructed a "Great Basilica of Hercules" next to a colossal statue of the hero himself. To promote Arianism, the king commissioned a small Arian cathedral, the Hagia Anastasis, which contains the Arian Baptistery. Three more churches built by Theodoric in Ravenna and its suburbs, S. Andrea dei Goti, S. Giorgio and S. Eusebio, were destroyed in the 13th, 14th and 15th centuries. Theodoric built the Palace of Theodoric for himself in Ravenna, modeled on the Great Palace of Constantinople. It was an expansion of an earlier Roman structure. The palace church of Christ the Redeemer survives and is known today as the Basilica of Sant'Apollinare Nuovo. It was Theodoric's personal church of worship and was modeled specifically according to his tastes. An equestrian statue of Theodoric was erected in the square in front of the palace. Statues like these were symbols of the ancient world, and Theodoric's equestrian likeness was meant to convey his status as the undisputed ruler of the western empire.

Theodoric the Great was interred in Ravenna, but his bones were scattered and his mausoleum was converted to a church after Belisarius conquered the city in 540. His mausoleum is considered one of the finest monuments in Ravenna and a significant court monument of the Roman Empire's early successor states. Unlike all the other contemporary buildings in Ravenna, which were made of brick, the Mausoleum of Theodoric was built completely from fine quality stone ashlars. Possibly as a reference to the Goths' tradition of an origin in Scandinavia, the architect decorated the frieze with a pattern found in 5th- and 6th-century Scandinavian metal adornments.

=== Rome ===
The Palace of Domitian on the Palatine Hill was reconstructed, using the receipts from a specially levied tax; while the city walls of Rome were rebuilt, a feat celebrated by the Senate of Rome with a gilded statue of Theodoric. The Senate's Curia, the Theatre of Pompey, the city aqueducts, sewers and a granary were refurbished and repaired and statues were set up in the Flavian Amphitheatre.

== Religion ==
In 522 the philosopher Boethius became his magister officiorum (head of all the government and court services). Boethius was a Roman aristocrat and Christian humanist, who was also a philosopher, poet, theologian, mathematician, astronomer, translator and commentator on Aristotle and other Greek luminaries. It is hard to overestimate this one-time servant and eventual victim of Theodoric for his influence on philosophy, particularly Christian philosophy, throughout the Middle Ages. Boethius's treatises and commentaries became textbooks for medieval students, and the great Greek philosophers were unknown except for his Latin translations. (Note: Cassiodorus succeeded Boethius as Theodoric's magister in 523. The pliant historian and courtier could be counted on to provide refined touches to official correspondence. "To the monarch you [Cassiodorus] were a friendly judge and an honored intimate. For when he became free from his official cares, he looked to your conversation for the precepts of the sages, that he might make himself a worthy equal to the great men of old. Ever curious, he desired to hear about the courses of the stars, the tides of the sea, and legendary fountains, that his earnest study of natural science might make him seem to be a veritable philosopher in the purple" (Cassiodorus's letterbook, Variae 9.24.8).) The execution of Boethius did nothing to dissipate tensions between Arians and Catholics but merely raised additional questions about barbarian imperial legitimacy.

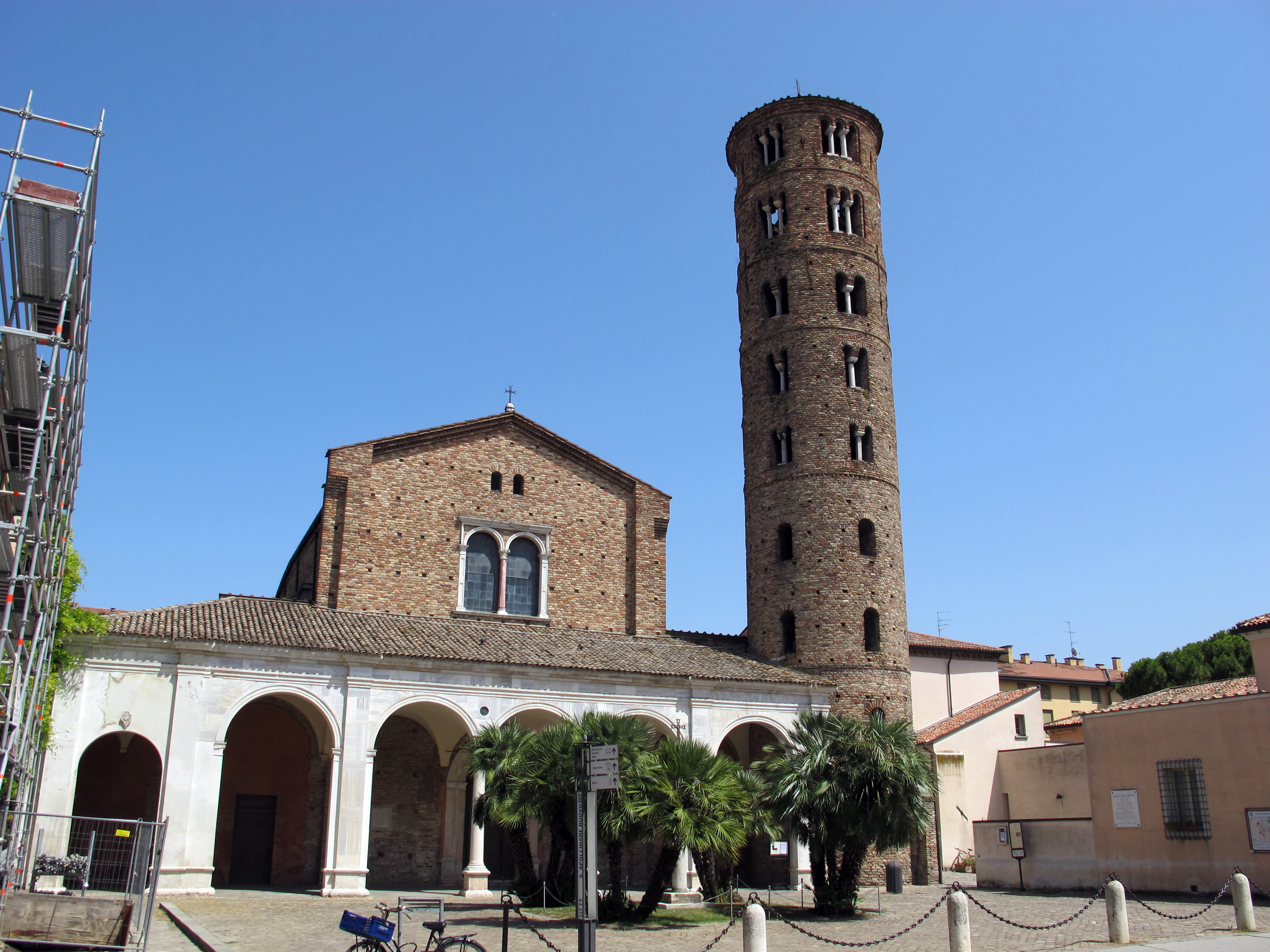
The Basilica of Sant'Apollinare Nuovo, the church of the Palace of Theodoric in Ravenna

Theodoric was of the Arian (nontrinitarian) faith, and in his final years he was no longer the disengaged Arian patron of religious toleration that he had seemed earlier in his reign. "Indeed, his death cut short what could well have developed into a major persecution of Catholic churches in retaliation for measures taken by Justinian in Constantinople against Arians there." Despite the Byzantine caesaropapism, which conflated imperial and ecclesiastical authority in the same person—whereby Theodoric's Arian beliefs were tolerated under two separate emperors—the fact remained that to most clergy across the Eastern Empire, Theodoric was a heretic. At the end of his reign quarrels arose with his Roman subjects and the Byzantine emperor Justin I over the matter of Arianism. These quarrels ultimately led to the death of Boethius and Pope John I in 524 and 526, respectively. Relations between the two realms deteriorated, although Theodoric's military abilities dissuaded the Byzantines from waging war against him. After his death, that reluctance faded quickly.

== Legacy ==
Seeking to restore the glory of ancient Rome, Theodoric ruled Italy during one of its most peaceful and prosperous periods and was accordingly hailed as a new Trajan and Valentinian I for his building efforts and his religious toleration. His far-sighted goals included taking what was best from Roman culture and combining it with Gothic energy and physical power as a way into the future. Historian Ian Wood avowed that Theodoric, much like Odoacer before him, was "effectively a Roman ruler, albeit one whose authority depended on his barbarian following"; although Gregory of Tours later reported Theodoric "as king of Italy and not king of the Goths." Perhaps this can be attributed to the fact that relatively amicable relations between Goths and Romans were maintained throughout Theodoric's term of rule.

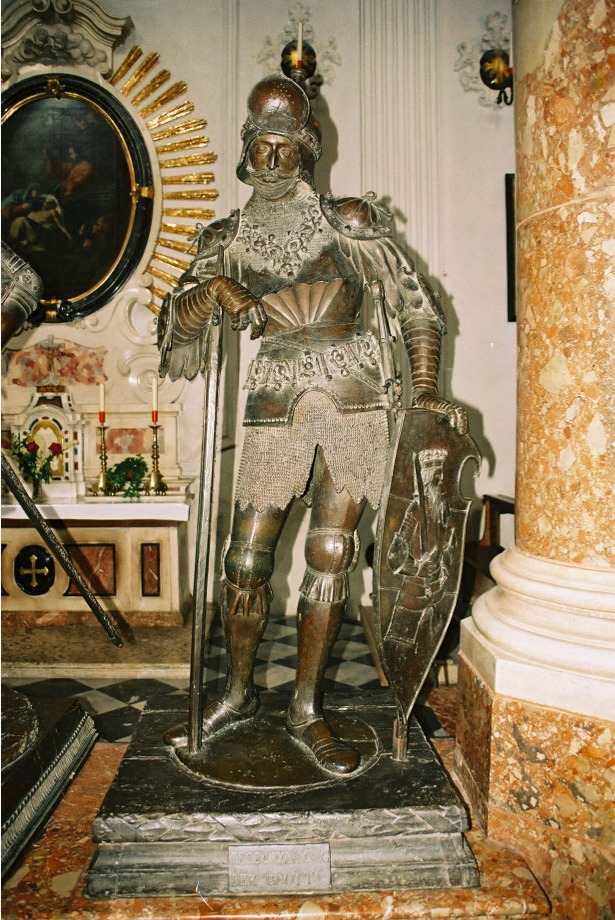
Bronze statue of Theodoric the Great (by Peter Vischer the Elder, 1512–13), from the monument of Emperor Maximilian I in the Court Church at Innsbruck

In terms of the early successor states' legacy following the Roman West's collapse, Ian Wood commented:

Continuity of political ideology and organisational practice is clearest for Italy under Theodoric, which is not surprising, for he effectively took over what had been the central imperial bureaucracy, as can be seen in the Variae of Cassiodorus. Other rulers inherited the administrative offices of West Roman provinces, together with the authority of military officials, although they also imitated the style of imperial rulership.

While historian John Julius Norwich, describing the lasting greatness of the Ostrogoth and former king of Italy, wrote:

No other Germanic ruler, setting up his throne on the ruins of the Western Empire, possessed a fraction of his statesmanship and political vision; and when he died ... Italy lost the greatest of her early medieval rulers, unequalled until the days of Charlemagne.

Memories of Theodoric's reign made him a hero of medieval German legends, as Dietrich von Bern, where the two figures have represented the same person.

=== Medieval reception and misuse ===
Theodoric is an important figure in Germanic heroic legend as the character Dietrich von Bern (Old High German: Deotrīh), known in Old Norse as Þjóðrekr or Þiðrekr, and Old English as Þēodrīc. In German legends, Dietrich becomes an exile from his native kingdom of Lombardy, fighting with the help of Etzel against his usurping uncle, Ermenrich. Only the Old High German Hildebrandslied still contains Odoacer (Old High German: Otacher) as Dietrich's antagonist. The 13th century Norse Þiðreks saga, based on lost Low German sources, moves the location of Dietrich's life to Westphalia and northern Germany. The legends paint a generally positive picture of Dietrich, with only some influence visible from the negative traditions of the church.

Beyond the appropriation of Theodoric’s legacy for medieval legends, his namesake and exploits were also seized upon in various nationalist contexts, particularly in 19th- and 20th-century Germany. For their politico-ideological purposes, historians and ideologues recast Theodoric as a prototypical Germanic hero, emphasizing his supposed racial and cultural purity. During the Nazi era, he was celebrated as a model of Germanic leadership and correspondingly used in state propaganda.

=== Modern historiographical debate ===
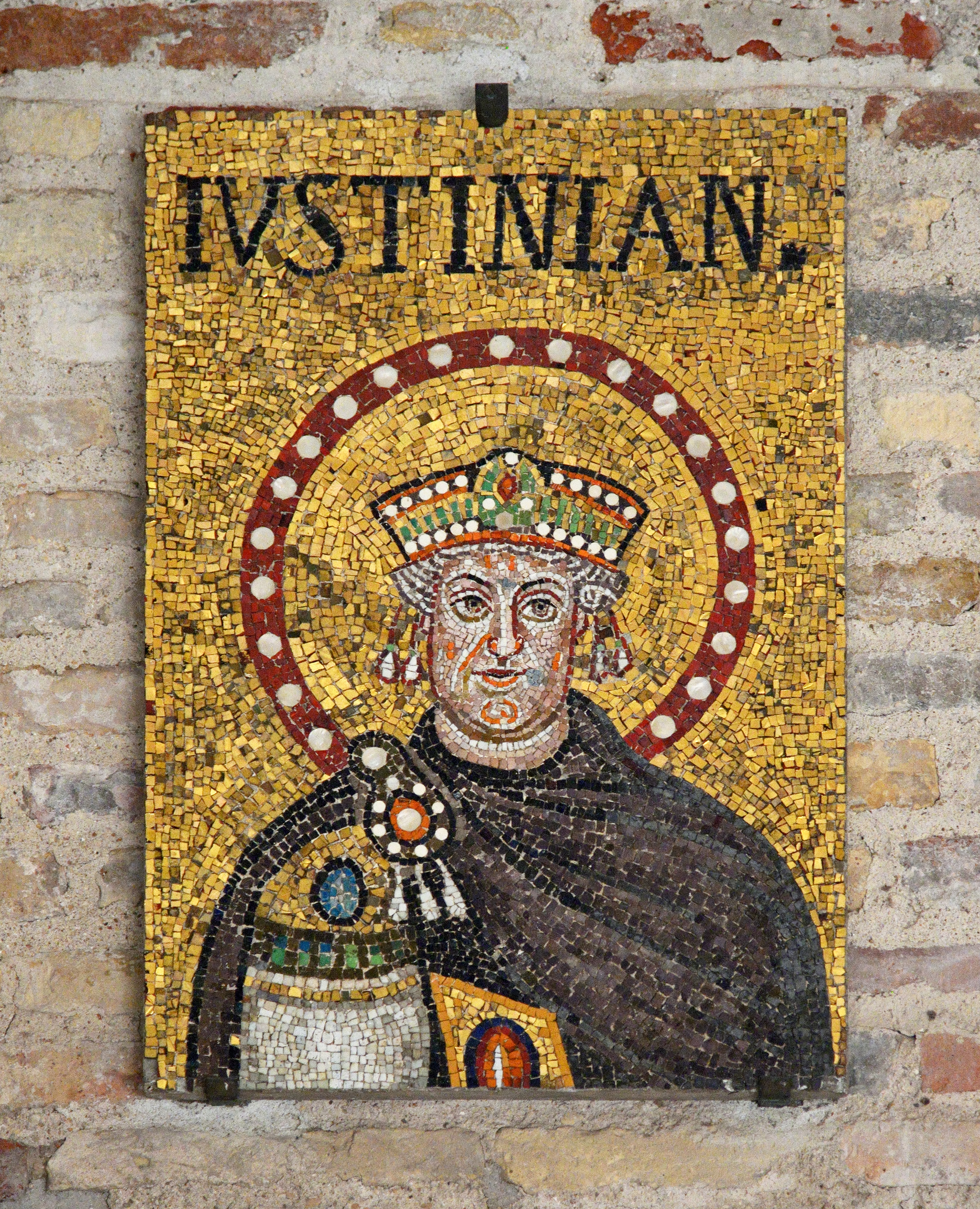
Mosaic of a ruler in imperial dress, Basilica of Sant'Apollinare Nuovo; long identified as Justinian (the inscription dates to an 1863 restoration), though some scholars have argued it originally depicted Theodoric.

There is an ongoing debate among modern historians as to how to qualify the nature of power Theodoric wielded in his domains. Traditionalists have argued for some time that Theodoric was a Germanic king, citing as their frame of reference later Byzantine sources—written during the Gothic war—that brand him as a barbarian king, who merely mimicked Roman customs. One scholar, Jonathan J. Arnold, advocates that this nature changed during the course of the 6th century; Arnold alludes to local and contemporary sources such as Magnus Felix Ennodius's Vita beatissimi viri Epiphani episcopi Ticinensis ecclesiae, Cassiodorus's Variae and Laudes or the Pars Posterior of the Anonymus Valesianus, arguing therefrom that Rome in the West did not fall in 476, but merely awaited a "proper Roman emperor to rule it". According to Arnold, these two sources ultimately reveal that Theodoric was actually viewed both by the Italian nobility and the Eastern court in Constantinople as a legitimate Western Roman emperor.

Arnold built his case on the fact that Theodoric widely used the title of princeps for himself, and employed the term Res Publica to describe the domain he ruled. These titles, although archaic, were customarily reserved for the emperor and his empire. Thereto Arnold explains that the restraint shown by Theodoric in refraining to use titles such as Imperator, Imperium or Augustus was aimed at sparing the pride of the Eastern monarchy and ensuring Byzantium of its seniority, but that this did not diminish Theodoric's claim to the purple in the West. (Note: Jonathan J. Arnold further justifies his claim by stating that Theodoric behaved as an emperor, using and wearing the imperial regalia returned by Anastasius I Dicorus in 497. Beyond these observations, Arnold identifies how Theodoric's imperial authority was implicitly recognized in the East to the extent that the Ostrogothic king was allowed to name consuls. Then there is the latinisation of his name to Flavius Theodoricus, his full administrative career in the East, which culminated with a consulship in 484 that granted him senatorial nobility and the capacity to impose Roman law upon Italo-Romans and Gothic populations alike.)

This view is however rejected by other scholars, such as Theodoric's most recent biographer, Hans-Ulrich Wiemer. He claims that Jonathan J. Arnold takes at face value, comments of a few interested parties among the Italian nobility. Wiemer contends that these few sources, close to Theodoric and of a doubtful impartiality, should not be used to infer the general opinion toward Theodoric from all classes of the Italian population or among the residents of Constantinople. He further states that this vision of Theodoric's position fails to address the duality of his rule; namely, having to retain the loyalty of both Romans and Goths alike. Wiemer posits that, "The “Roman” interpretation of Theodoric has recently been taken to extremes in the theory that Theodoric was virtually a Western Roman emperor in Italy. According to this view, Theodoric restored the Roman Empire in the West, which he ruled as princeps Romanus. » Demonstrating his doubts on this, Wiemer points out how during Theodoric's rule, he kept the two ethnic groups—Italo-Romans and Goths—clearly separated. For instance, only Goths could carry certain military equipment (swords, lances, shields, and helmets) or assume key positions in the military hierarchy, and the hairstyles between Goths and Romans remained distinctive, let alone their language. Wiemer also avows that the Eastern court never formally acknowledged Theodoric as a Western Emperor, a necessary condition to become one, the last of which ever recognized by Constantinople being Julius Nepos, who died in 480. Additionally, Wiemer highlights the fact that for political reasons, the Frankish and Burgundian kings never recognized Theodoric as an emperor—each established as rulers in their own right—and as the Ostrogothic king's Germanic kinsman, they were tied to one another via diplomatic marriages.

== See also ==
- Alboin
- Alfred the Great
- Anicius Manlius Severinus Boethius
- Ardaric
- Charlemagne
- Clovis I
- Ermanaric
- Gaiseric
- Hermeric
- Liutprand, King of the Lombards
- Liuvigild
- Odoacer
- Ostrogothic Kingdom
- Ricimer
- Theodoric I (Visigothic king)
- Totila

== Sources ==
- Amory, Patrick (1997). People and Identity in Ostrogothic Italy, 489–554. Cambridge; New York: Cambridge University Press. ISBN 0-521-57151-0.
- Arnold, Jonathan J. (2014). Theoderic and the Roman Imperial Restoration. Cambridge; New York: Cambridge University Press. ISBN 978-1-107-05440-0.
- Boethius (2000). The Consolation of Philosophy. Translated by P. G. Walsh. Oxford and New York: Oxford University Press. ISBN 0-19-283883-0.
- Brown, Peter (1989). The World of Late Antiquity: AD 150–750. New York and London: W.W. Norton and Co. ISBN 978-0-39395-803-4.
- Brown, Thomas S. (2007). "The Role of Arianism in Ostrogothic Italy: The Evidence from Ravenna". In J. B. Barnish; Sam J. Barnish; Federico Marazzi (eds.). The Ostrogoths from the Migration Period to the Sixth Century: An Ethnographic Perspective. Woodridge; Suffolk; Rochester, NY: Boydell Press. ISBN 978-1-84383-074-0.
- Burns, Thomas (1991). A History of the Ostrogoths. Bloomington; Indianapolis: Indiana University Press. ISBN 978-0-25320-600-8.
- Collins, Roger (2004). Visigothic Spain, 409–711. Malden, MA: Blackwell Publishing. ISBN 978-0-47075-461-0.
- Dailey, E. T. (2015). Queens, Consorts, Concubines: Gregory of Tours and Women of the Merovingian Elite. Leiden; Boston: Brill. ISBN 978-9-00429-089-1.
- Delbrück, Hans (1990). The Barbarian Invasions. History of the Art of War. Vol. II. Lincoln and London: University of Nebraska Press. ISBN 978-0-80329-200-0.
- Elton, Hugh (2018). The Roman Empire in Late Antiquity: A Political and Military History. Cambridge and New York: Cambridge University Press. ISBN 978-1-10845-631-9.
- Fletcher, Richard (1997). The Barbarian Conversion: From Paganism to Christianity. New York: Henry Holt. ISBN 0-8050-2763-7.
- Frassetto, Michael (2003). Encyclopedia of Barbarian Europe: Society in Transformation. Santa Barbara, CA: ABC-CLIO. ISBN 978-1-57607-263-9.
- Fried, Johannes (2015). The Middle Ages. Cambridge and London: The Belknap Press of Harvard University Press. ISBN 978-0-67405-562-9.
- Geary, Patrick J. (1999). "Barbarians and Ethnicity". In G.W. Bowersock; Peter Brown; Oleg Grabar (eds.). Late Antiquity: A Guide to the Postclassical World. Cambridge, MA: The Belknap Press of Harvard University Press. ISBN 978-0-67451-173-6.
- Halsall, Guy (2007). Barbarian Migrations and the Roman West, 376–568. Cambridge and New York: Cambridge University Press. ISBN 978-0-52143-543-7.
- Hartmann, Martina (2009). Die Königen im frühen Mittelalter (in German). Stuttgart: Verlag W. Kohlhammer. ISBN 978-3-17018-473-2.
- Haymes, Edward R.; Samples, Susan T. (1996). Heroic legends of the North: an introduction to the Nibelung and Dietrich cycles. New York: Garland. ISBN 0815300336.
- Heather, Peter (2013). The Restoration of Rome: Barbarian Popes & Imperial Pretenders. Oxford: Oxford University Press. ISBN 978-0-19-936851-8.
- Heinzle, Joachim (1999). Einführung in die mittelhochdeutsche Dietrichepik. Berlin, New York: De Gruyter. ISBN 3-11-015094-8.
- Heydemann, Gerda (2016). "The Ostrogothic Kingdom: Ideologies and Transitions". In Jonathan J. Arnold; M. Shane Bjornlie; Kristina Sessa (eds.). A Companion to Ostrogothic Italy. Leiden and Boston: Brill. ISBN 978-9004-31376-7.
- Hodgkin, Thomas (1896). Italy and Her Invaders. London: Oxford University Press.
- James, Edward (2014). Europe's Barbarians, AD 200–600. London and New York: Routledge. ISBN 978-0-58277-296-0.
- Johnson, Mark J. (1988). "Toward a History of Theoderic's Building Program". Dumbarton Oaks Papers. 42: 73–96. doi:10.2307/1291590. JSTOR 1291590.
- Kim, Hyun Jin (2013). The Huns, Rome and the Birth of Europe. Cambridge University Press.
- Koenigsberger, H.G. (1987). Medieval Europe, 400–1500. Essex: Longman. ISBN 0-582-49403-6.
- Kulikowski, Michael (2019). The Tragedy of Empire: From Constantine to the Destruction of Roman Italy. Cambridge, MA: The Belknap Press of Harvard University Press. ISBN 978-0-67466-013-7.
- Langer, William L. (1968). "Italy, 489–554". An Encyclopedia of World History. George G. Harrap and Co.
- Lienert, Elisabeth, ed. (2008). Dietrich-Testimonien des 6. bis 16. Jahrhunderts. Texte und Studien zur mittelhochdeutschen Heldenepik (in German). Vol. 4. Berlin: de Gruyter. ISBN 978-3484645042.
- Mango, Cyril (2002). "Introduction". In Cyril Mango (ed.). The Oxford History of Byzantium. New York: Oxford University Press. ISBN 978-0-19814-098-6.
- Martindale, J.R. (1980). "Fl. Theodericus 7". The Prosopography of the Later Roman Empire. Vol. 2 (A.D. 395–527). London; New York: Cambridge University Press. pp. 1077–1084. ISBN 0-521-20159-4.
- Näsman, Ulf (2008). "Från Attila till Karl den Store". In M. Olausson (ed.). Hem till Jarlabanke: Jord, makt och evigt liv i östra Mälardalen under järnåder och medeltid [Home to Jarlabanke: Land, power and eternal life in eastern Mälardalen during the Iron Age and the Middle Ages] (in Swedish). Lund: Historiska media. ISBN 978-91-85507-94-8.
- Norwich, John Julius (1988). Byzantium: The Early Centuries. London: Guild Publishing.
- O'Donnell, James (1995). "Cassiodorus". Georgetown University online text. Berkeley, CA: University of California Press.
- Owen, Francis (1990). The Germanic People: Their Origin, Expansion & Culture. New York: Dorset Press. ISBN 978-0-88029-579-6.
- Ring, Trudy; Salkin, Robert M.; La Boda, Sharon (1996). International Dictionary of Historic Places: Southern Europe. Taylor & Francis. ISBN 978-1-884964-02-2.
- Rosenwein, Barbara H. (2009). A Short History of the Middle Ages. Toronto: University of Toronto Press. ISBN 978-1-44260-104-8.
- Silber, Manfred (1970). The Gallic Royalty of the Merovingians in Its Relationship to the Orbis Terrarum Romanum During the 5th and the 6th Centuries A.D. Zürich: Peter Lang.
- Steffens, Franz (1903). Lateinische Paläographie: Hundert Tafeln in Lichtdruck, mit gegenüberstehender Transscription, nebst Erläuterungen und einer systematischen Darstellung der Entwicklung der lateinischen Schrift. Freiburg: Universitäts-Buchhandlung. ISBN 9783112202593.
- Stenroth, Ingmar (2015). Goternas Historia (in Swedish). Göteborg: Citytidningen CT. ISBN 978-91-974194-8-2.
- Trerè, Filippo (5 July 2021). "The Portrait of Justinian in Sant'Apollinare Nuovo". Ravenna Mosaici. Opera di Religione della Diocesi di Ravenna.
- Tung, Anthony M. (2001). Preserving the World's Great Cities: The Destruction and Renewal of the Historic Metropolis. New York: Clarkson Potter. ISBN 978-0-51770-148-5.
- Vasiliev, A. A. (1950). Justin the First. Cambridge, MA: Harvard University Press. OCLC 310492065.
- Wiemer, Hans-Ulrich (2015). "Rezension von: Jonathan J. Arnold: Theoderic and the Roman Imperial Restoration". Sehepunkt. 15 (10).
- Wiemer, Hans-Ulrich (2023). Theoderic the Great: King of Goths, Ruler of Romans. Translated by Noël Dillon. New Haven and London: Yale University Press. ISBN 978-0-30025-443-3.
- Wolfram, Herwig (1988). History of the Goths. Berkeley and Los Angeles: University of California Press. ISBN 0-520-05259-5.
- Wolfram, Herwig (1997). The Roman Empire and its Germanic Peoples. Berkeley and Los Angeles: University of California Press. ISBN 0-520-08511-6.
- Wood, Ian (2025). Europe in Late Antiquity. Berlin and Boston: De Gruyter. ISBN 978-3-11035-264-1.

Preceded by Theodemir	King of the Ostrogoths; 474–526	Succeeded by Athalaric
Preceded by Odoacer	King of Italy; 493–526	Succeeded by Athalaric
Preceded by Anicius Acilius Aginatius Faustus	Roman consul 484 with Decius Marius Venantius Basilius	Succeeded by Q. Aurelius Memmius Symmachus
