= Ereleuva =

Mother of king Theoderic the Great

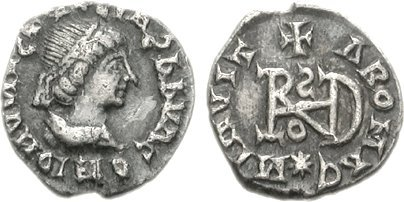
Quarter depicting Theodoric the Great, her son

Ereleuva (born before AD 440, died c. 500?) was the mother of the Ostrogothic king Theodoric the Great. She is often referred to as the concubine of Theodoric's father, Theodemir, although that Gelasius refers to her as regina ("queen") suggests that she had a prominent social position despite the informality of her union with Theodemir.

Ereleuva was a Chalcedonian Christian, and was baptised with the name Eusebia. Ereleuva is regarded as having taken to Christianity quite seriously, as indicated by her correspondence with Pope Gelasius I and mention of her in Ennodius's Panegyric of Theoderic. As she had been baptized as a Catholic and Theodemir, like most Ostrogoths, was probably a follower of Arianism, their marriage was not considered entirely religiously valid.

Ereleuva's name was variously spelled by historians in antiquity as Ereriliva (by the fragmentary chronicle of Anonymus Valesianus, c. 527) and Erelieva (by Jordanes), and is now largely known to modern historians as Ereleuva, as she was addressed most frequently by Pope Gelasius I.
