= Athalaric =

King of the Ostrogoths from 526 to 534

Athalaric 𐌰𐌸𐌰𐌻𐌰𐍂𐌴𐌹𐌺𐍃
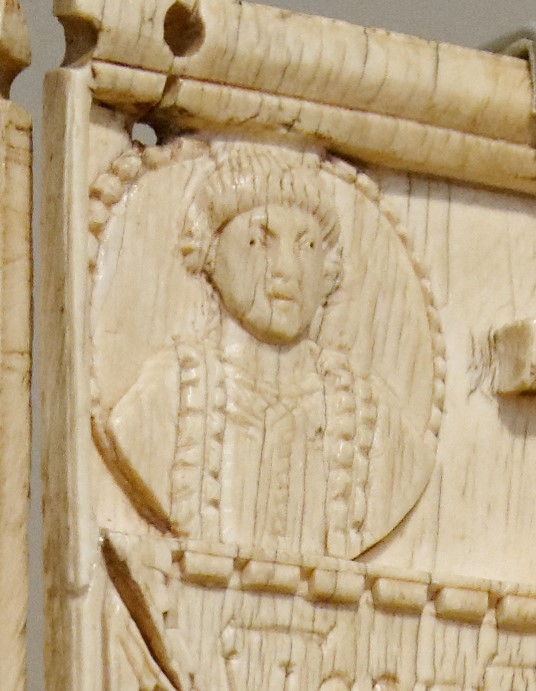
- Detail of the consular diptych of Rufius Gennadius Probus Orestes, showing Athalaric, c. 530. Victoria and Albert Museum, London.

King of the Ostrogoths
- Reign: 526 – 534
- Predecessor: Theodoric the Great
- Successor: Amalasuintha
- Regent: Amalasuintha
- Born: c. 516
- Died: 2 October 534 (aged 17–18)
- Dynasty: Amal
- Father: Eutharic
- Mother: Amalasuintha

Athalaric (Latin: Athalaricus; c. 516 – 2 October 534) was the king of the Ostrogoths in Italy between 526 and 534. He was a son of Eutharic and Amalasuintha, the youngest daughter of Theodoric the Great, whom Athalaric succeeded as king in 526. Athalaric was described to live a hedonistic lifestyle by Procopius of Caesarea. His mother managed the kingdom during his reign, and he died as a teenager.

== Life ==
Athalaric's grandfather was Theodoric the Great (470–526). His area of rule encompassed Italy, southern Spain, southern France, and the western Balkans. Theodoric died in 526, when Athalaric became his successor.

Athalaric was about ten years old, so his mother, Amalasuintha, held all the real power, which allowed her to make decisions about the kingdom's politics and negotiate with foreign rulers like Justinian I, at least within the 530s. For example, around 533, she had Emperor Justinian protect the Ostrogothic Kingdom.

Amalasuintha also controlled the type of education Athalaric would undergo. According to Procopius, the Goth aristocracy desired Athalaric to be raised in Gothic, but Amalasuintha wanted him to resemble the Roman rulers. Amalasuintha adhered to Roman learning and customs that were especially objectionable to other Goths, as they saw it as cowardly and submissive. Eventually, Amalasuintha was forced to accept the will of her fellow Goths by allowing Athalaric to spend time with other boys around his age. It is not clear how effective his Roman education was. It is also unknown who his Gothic teacher was, but generally, the Gothic aristocracy in the palace exerted fierce pressure on the monarchy and focused on military education instead of grammar and rhetoric, which would be done in Roman education.

Athalaric drank heavily and indulged in vicious excesses, which ruined his constitution. After a large party in 533, rumors spread that Athalaric was ill. Athalaric's condition worsened, and he died later in October of 534, probably from a combination of excessive drinking and disease, probably diabetes.

In 1838, a burial was discovered in the hills of Bologna and the corpse was attributed to Athalaric by numismatist Filippo Schiassi. The skull was donated by archbishop Carlo Oppizzoni to physicist Luigi Calori and is now on display at the Anatomical Wax Museum of Bologna, while the rest of the skeleton was reburied in a now-lost location. A modern analysis has attributed the skull to a 50-year-old male who lived in the 16th-17th century, making the traditional identification with Athalaric implausible.

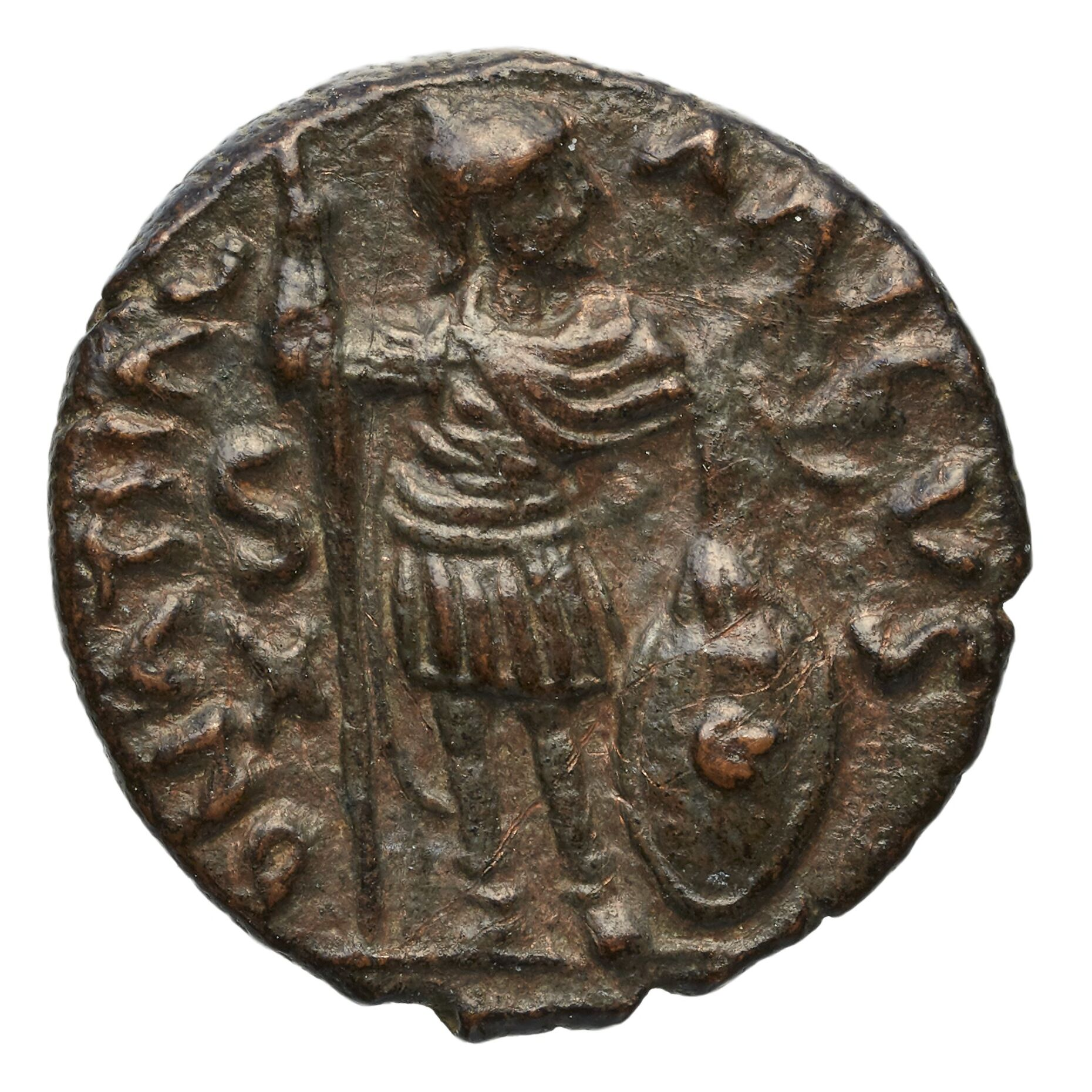
Reverse of a nummi with the legends: DN ATHAL/ARICV. It show Athalaric as a warrior holding a spear and shield.

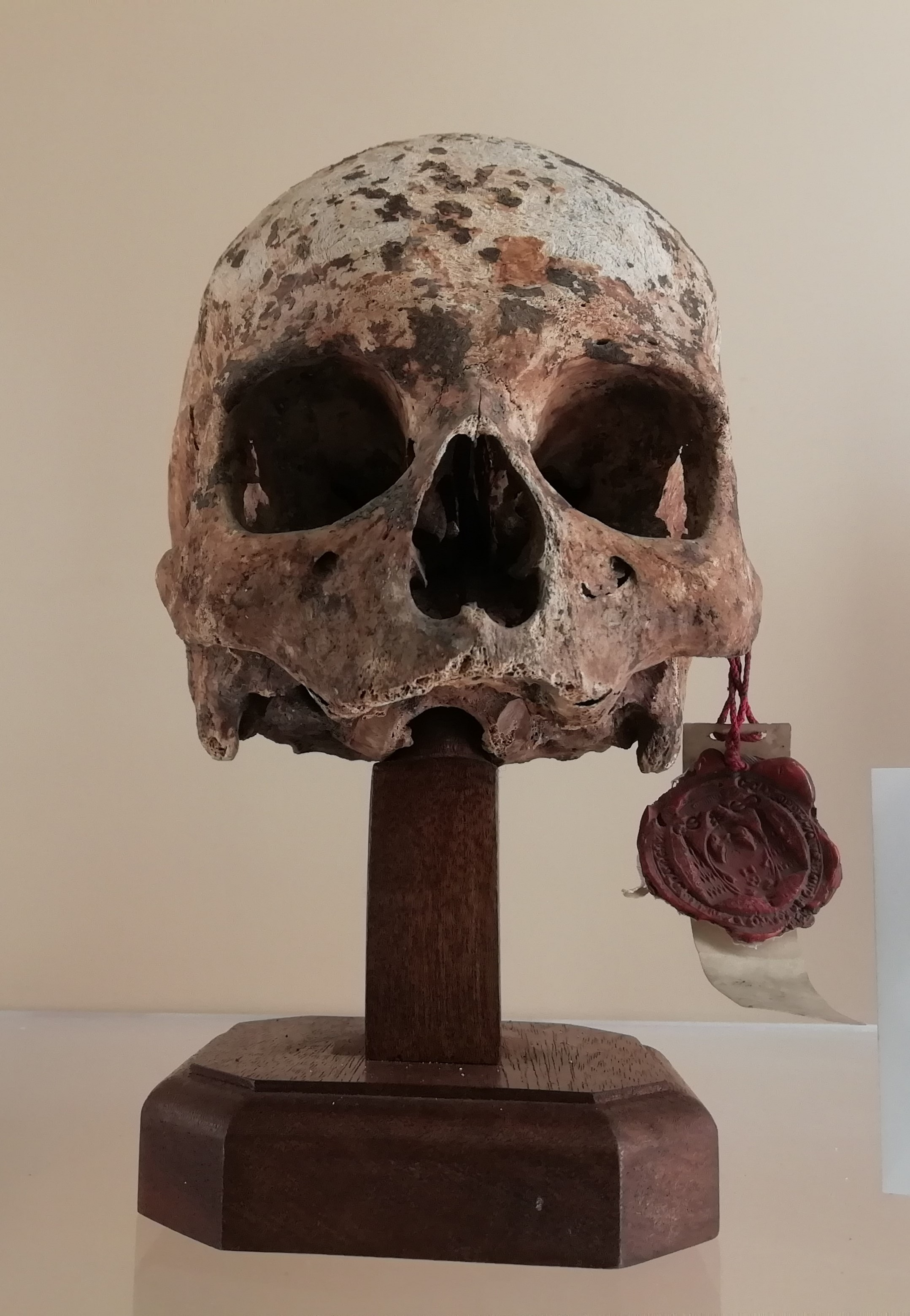
Alleged skull of Athalaric at the Anatomical Wax Museum of Bologna, now believed to have belonged to a middle-aged, 16th-17th century man.

== Sources ==
Regnal titles
Preceded by Theodoric the Great	King of the Ostrogoths in Italy; 526–534	Succeeded by Amalasuintha
