= Eugenia of Rome =

Roman Christian martyr (died c 258)

Saint Eugenia of Rome
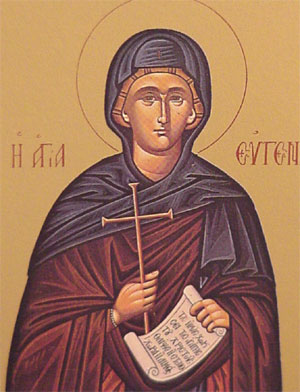

Virgin martyr
- Died: 258 AD; Rome
- Venerated in: Catholic Church; Eastern Orthodox Church; Oriental Orthodox Church
- Feast: December 25 (Roman Catholic Church); December 24 (Eastern Orthodox Church); December 27 (medieval Hispanic liturgy, as attested by calendars of the time, such as that in the Antiphonary of Leon, for example); January 23 (Armenian Apostolic Church)
- Attributes: cross, scroll

Eugenia of Rome (died c AD 258) was an early Christian Roman martyr whose feast day is celebrated on December 25 in the Roman Catholic Church, on December 24 (January 6, New Style) in the Eastern Catholic Churches and Eastern Orthodox Church, and on January 23 in the Armenian Apostolic Church.

== Legend ==
She was said to have been the daughter of Philip, a "vir illustris" sent to govern Egypt by Commodus in his seventh consulate (192). (Note: Marta Sordi has tried to prove that Philip was a historical figure by arguing he was Gnaeus Domitius Philippus, who served prefect of the vigiles then "dux" of Egypt.) Philip thus left Rome with his wife Claudia and his children Sergius, Avitus and Eugenia and set up a home in Alexandria. Eugenia was beautiful, virtuous and studious, and when she was sixteen she studied Greek and Latin literature and gained philosophers' admiration for her gravity. Her father wished her to marry and provided several handsome candidates, but she forcefully rejected them, thinking good morals superior to high birth.

By luck she was given copies of "the letter of Paul" (the title of which is not specified) and the Acts of Paul and Thecla, which she read keenly. She then gained her parents' permission to go out in a covered litter on their country estate and during the journey discussed the two books with her eunuchs, Protus and Hyacinth (who grew up with her and shared her pagan background). She argued that all pagan religious writings were ridiculous and hollow compared to the two books and – as they continued their discussion – they heard Christians led by Helenus, bishop of Heliopolis, singing "All the gods of the nations are demons" (Psalm 96:5). She saw this as the answer to her questions and decided to go back the next day to see the Christians, but only after the eunuchs had cut her hair and disguised her in men's clothing (much as the character Thecla does in the abovementioned text).

The eunuchs accompanied her to see the Christians, who this time were singing the words of Isaiah 26:7, which were also relevant to her own situation. Helenus then accepted her and the eunuchs' request to be baptised and did not question Eugenia's disguise despite seeing through it. All three of them then became monks, with Eugenia taking the male name Eugene. She gained great renown among the monks for her piety and healing abilities. Two years after becoming a monk, when the abbot died, her community unanimously voted her to be his successor, but she obstinately refused the honour until a random 'opening of the book' led her to Matthew 20:25–27.

A rich and noble matron named Melanthia then came to the abbey to be healed, which Eugenia accomplished by making the sign of the cross. Melanthia continued to return to the monastery under the guise of piety, but, in fact, had fallen in love with her healer, failing to notice Eugenia's male disguise. After Eugenia refused her proposal of marriage, Melanthia pretended to be sick again so that they might be left alone together. The matron then made indecent proposals, which Eugenia rejected in horror. Melanthia then returned to Alexandria and accused 'Eugene' of trying to rape her, leading Philip to arrest Eugenia, not realizing she was his own daughter.

Eugene/Eugenia appeared before Philip's tribunal in the city's amphitheater and dropped her disguise by tearing her tunic and showing her breast, revealing her real name and her relationship to Philip. All four of her brothers rushed to hug her, soon joined by their mother. The crowd was converted to Christianity, while fire descended from heaven to consume Melanthia and all her household, and the church in Alexandria was closed for eight years. Multitudes of pagans were baptised, and soon everyone in Alexandria had converted to Christianity. After Helenus' death, Philip was unanimously chosen to be his successor as bishop, though he also remained prefect for a time. By Philip's efforts almost all of Egypt was converted to Christianity before he was martyred fifteen months after the tribunal, stabbed in his church while saying the Lord's Prayer by pagans paid by the new prefect Perennius, (Note: Gnaeus Domitius Philippus's successor was in fact Aurelius Bassus, in post from 242 to 245, but Perennius or Perennis is often used in hagiographies for high-level officials among persecutors, such as the real praetorian prefect Tigidius Perennis in the Acts of Apollonius Sacceas (BHG 1489), 45.) who replaced Philip following his conversion.

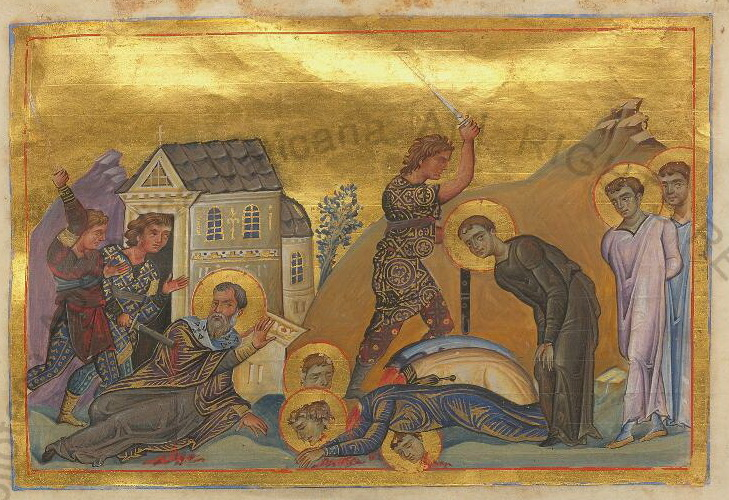
'Martyrdom of Eugenia of Rome and others', a miniature from the Menologion of Basil II, 976-1025 (Vat. gr. 1613. P. 270).

Fifty years later, after Christian persecution was reinstated by Emperor Valerian, Eugenia was 70 or 80 years old, living in Rome and converting maidens, who were soon martyred. She was arrested and condemned to death by Gallienus (who reigned alongside Valerian in 253-260 and then alone in 260–268), who was angry with her for converting his niece Basilla to Christianity. He ordered Eugenia to make a sacrifice to the pagan goddess Diana, but when she entered Diana's temple and prayed before the cult image, it crumbled to dust. She was thus tied to a block of stone and thrown into the river Tiber, but the block floated and she was only submerged up to her knees.

The emperor then tried to scald her to death in the hot rooms of the "Severan" (i.e. Caracallan) baths, but the furnaces miraculously went out as soon as she arrived. Next, he enclosed Eugenia in a cave without food or water, but she was kept alive by Jesus, who came to her in a brilliant light.

Her former eunuchs, Protus and Hyacinth, were beheaded by the sword on September 11, 258, and Eugenia followed suit the same year after Christ appeared to her in a dream and told her that she would die on the Feast of the Nativity. After her death, she appeared to her mother, who had come weeping to her tomb. Eugenia told her that she, too, would soon die, and entreated her to convert to Christianity. Claudia died that Sunday and her sons, Avitus and Sergius, buried her. They went on to evangelise the Romans and also died as saints.

== Sources ==
The earliest source on the saint is a Life in Latin (BHL 2667), surviving under the title Passion of the Martyr Saints Protus and Hyacinth. Novel-like in composition, it was edited in Italy between 450 and 499. It belongs to the genres of 'hagiographic novels of recognition', and 'stories of women disguised as monks', the latter recently renamed 'transgender stories' The text was translated into Greek several times around the 7th century (BHG 607 w, x, y, z), retranslated into elegant Greek by Symeon the Metaphrast in the 10th century (BHG 608), and also into Syriac (BHO 282), Armenian (BHO 281) and Ethiopic (BHO 283 and 284).

In the meantime her cult had spread and she appeared in 5th century mosaics at the Basilica of Sant'Apollinare Nuovo in Ravenna and 6th century ones at the Eufrasiana in Parenzo, along with being mentioned and celebrated by Avitus of Vienne and Venantius Fortunatus. Her life also appeared in the Golden Legend in the 13th century. An edition of the Life was published in Milan just before 1478 by Boninus Mombritius, in his Sanctuarium seu vitae sanctorum, later republished with improvements by the monks at Solesmes Abbey.

=== Historicity ===
Unlike Basilla or Protus and Hyacinth (three martyrs buried in the same catacomb on the via Salaria vetus), Eugenia does not appear in the earliest catalogue of martyrs venerated in Rome, known as the Depositio martyrum included in the Chronograph of 354. This argues against her historicity, as does her absence from Pope Damasus I's 'Epigrams and Prudentius's martyrographic works. It seems Eugenia originated simply as the name of a hypothetical and obscure martyr or a pious and generous woman of Rome and was then - according to fabulous methods of hagiography detailed in Hippolyte Delehaye's work, especially Les légendes hagiographiques - applied to a real saint more or less 'retouched'. The name Eugenia (well-born in Greek) could have been taken from a tomb. Her hagiography's rich intertextuality has been treated by Eric Gordon Whatley

The stories attached to this Eugenia appealed to a wide variety of audiences from readers of Virgil and secular novels to pious Christians (especially women), monks and nuns looking for edifying tales. She takes on a multitude of roles - a learned, distinguished and beautiful noblewoman, a converted teenager fleeing her family, a new Thecla, a valiant Romano-Alexandrine athlete straddling two worlds (the prestige marytrdom-site of Rome and the exoticism of Egypt), heroine of chastity accompanied by two eunuchs, an innocent victim of calumny reminiscent of Phaedra, Potiphar's wife and the earliest Greek female doctor Agnodice, (Note: Caius Julius Hyginus gives her probably fictitious life story (Fabulae, 274, 10-13), in which she also disguises herself as a man, is unjustly accused of rape and is found innocent in front of a tribunal) and enactor of a daring anagnorisis. All these roles are stereotypes from 'epic passion narratives'. The work also has erotic undertones in her showing her beautiful breasts before a large crowd (repeated in the Life of Saint Apolinaria) and also potential lesbianism in the relationship desired by Melanthia. These undercurrents also left traces in later hagiography, at least in the eastern church, where the Coptic Legend of Hilaria (BHO 279) omits the showing of the breasts but includes a suspicion of incest between the saint and her sister.

The story was then anchored in history by making her father Philip and linking it to certain emperors, buildings in Rome and real saints about whose lives little was known. One of these was Basilla, a real Christian in whose cemetery Protus and Hyacinth had been buried, into Gallienus' niece and a convert of Eugenia's. Two more are Protus and Hyacinth, converted not only into pseudo-brothers of Eugenia but also into eunuchs, the perfect companions for a champion of chastity. (Note: A similar transformation was made to Nereus and Achilleus, turned anachronistically into Flavia Domitilla's servants.)

== Veneration ==
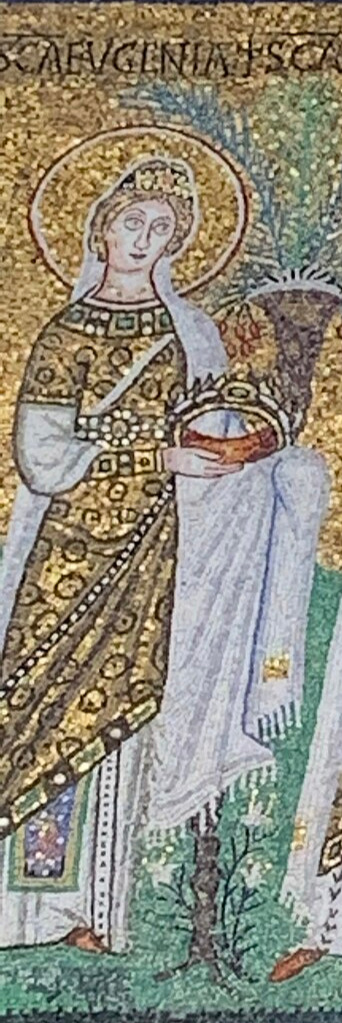
Mosaic from the Basilica di Sant'Apollinare Nuovo

There is a small village in the north of Portugal with the name of Santa Eugenia that contains a church with a painting of Saint Eugenia dressed as a boy in Roman-era attire. A local legend states that Eugenia passed through this area on a nearby Roman road and through Moure, which lies at a major intersection of ancient Roman roads.

There is also a tomb dating from about 1000 AD in the city of Barcelos, high on a hill that reads "tomb of Saint Eugenia." It is possible that this tomb is the tomb of Eugenia of Rome. During the Middle Ages, some saints were moved from Rome to the outer parts of Europe by monks. Patrick J. Geary, in his work Furta Sacra, states that "on April 5, 838, a monk named Felix appeared at Fulda with the remains of Eugenia of Rome along with those of Saints Cornelius, Callistus, Agapitus, Georgius, Vincentius, Maximus, Cecilia, Digna, Emerita, and Columbana."

St Eugenia / Eugenious is referenced with much veneration within the Trans Saints Zine, created by LGBTQ+ academics, researchers & artists. The sections about them are written by Orlen Crawford & Isabella Lewis, with an illustration by Carmen Walker-Vasquez.
