= Ostrogothic Ravenna =

Time period when Ravenna served as the capital of the Ostrogothic Kingdom

Ostrogothic Ravenna refers to the time period in which Ravenna, a city in Northeastern Italy, served as the capital of the Ostrogothic Kingdom, which existed between 493 and 553 CE. During that time, Ravenna saw a great renovation, in particular under Theodoric the Great (454–526). During his rule, Ravenna saw many of its finest monuments constructed or renovated, including the Basilica of Sant'Apollinare Nuovo, the Palace of Theoderic, and Mausoleum of Theodoric. Many of these monuments reflect the Arian faith of Theodoric and the Goths. Though an Arian Christian himself, Theodoric's rule was a time of religious tolerance in the city of Ravenna. His religious tolerance extended also to forging a balance between the Romans and Goths in Ravenna. Theodoric attempted to model Ravenna as a capital equivalent to that of Rome or Constantinople and as such was a defender of classical antiquity in a western world that saw much of its classical heritage disappearing.

Ravenna's newfound ascendance did not last under the successors of Theodoric as they lacked the respect that Theodoric commanded of both the Romans and Goths within his capital and the empire as a whole, in particular his grandson Athalaric who succeeded him at the age of eight under the regency of his mother Amalasuintha. The Gothic Kingdom eventually fell to the invasions by Belisarius as part of Justinian's ambitious plans of reconquering the territories of the western empire lost to Germanic invasions.

== History ==
=== Odovacar ===
In 476 the last emperor of the Western Roman Empire, Romulus Augustus, was forced to abdicate under invasions by Goths led by Odovacar. Upon the sacking of Rome by these Goths, Odovacar declared himself King of Italy and was able to conquer the peninsula as well as much of the "Dalmatian coast". Odovacar drew the ire of the imperial court at Constantinople as "a barbarian, a non-Roman, had deposed the Roman emperor in the original heartland of the empire. He had taken on the hated royal title and was getting ready to rule in the emperor’s place..." Odovacar, however, issued his coinage in the name of the emperor Nepos, whom Constantinople had never removed its recognition of when Romulus had assumed the imperial title therefore painting himself as merely overthrowing a previous usurper to the imperial throne.

=== Theodoric and the Establishment of the Ostrogothic Kingdom ===
==== Theodoric's Rise to power ====
Theodoric, from the age of seven had lived in the imperial court at Constantinople after a revolt by his father had been subdued. He returned to his own people, the Amal branch of the Goths, at the age of 18 in 471 and became the leader of his people in 474 upon the death of his father. Upon ascension to leadership he established himself as a capable leader both militarily and politically. He fought various wars both for and against the East Roman Empire as well as wars against other Gothic factions. He was recognized politically by Constantinople, who bestowed upon him first the title of patricius and named as magister militum Praesentalis in 476 and was appointed consul of the Eastern Empire in 484.

==== War with Odovacar ====
By the late 480's Theodoric had become leader of the most dominant Gothic force and found himself leading his people into Italy against Odovacar. There is much debate as to whether this was ordered by the Emperor Zeno or whether it was Theodoric's own decision. Primary sources conflict on this score. The Anonymus Valesianus, claims Theodoric moved on Italy at the urging of Zeno:

Theodoric stipulated with [Zeno], that if Odoacer should be vanquished, in return for his own labors in Odoacer's place he should rule in his stead only until the arrival of Zeno. Therefore, when the patrician Theodoric came from the city of Nova with the Gothic people, he was sent by the emperor Zeno from the regions of the Orient, in order to defend Italy for him.

-Anonymus Valesianus 2.49

Contrary to the account provided in Anonymus Valesianus, Jordanes makes the claim in his work, The Origin and Deeds of the Goths, Getica, that the idea was Theodoric's:

So [Theodoric] chose rather to seek a living by his own exertions...After pondering these matters, he said to the Emperor: "Though I lack nothing in serving your Empire, yet if Your Piety deem it worthy, be pleased to hear the desire of my heart"..."The western country, long ago governed by the rule of your ancestors and predecessors...--wherefore is it now shaken by the tyranny of the Torcilingi and the Rugi? Send me there with my race. Thus if you but say the word, you may be freed from the burden of expense here, and, if by the Lord's help I shall conquer, the fame of Your Piety shall be glorious there.

Jordanes, Getica LXII 289–291

In either case Theodoric and his Goths marched on Italy in 489 and waged war on Odovacar. Theodoric's forces quickly forced Odovacar to flee to Ravenna and in short succession they captured both Verona and Milan. In Milan both secular and ecclesiastical leaders, as well as Odovacar's commander-in-chief Tufa – though he would later betray Theodoric – and many of the defeated troops who joined Theodoric, welcomed him into the city as a representative of the emperor. In the summer of 490, with Odovacar back on the offensive, Alaric II of the Visigoths, in a rare moment of Gothic solidarity, sent troops to aid Theodoric in his efforts to remove Odovacar from power. Odoacer was forced to retreat once again into Ravenna, where Theodoric besieged him for two more years until Theodoric was finally able to gather the ships necessary to mount an effective blockade of Ravenna, which could only be effectively attacked from the sea.

==== Victory over Odovacar ====
It was not until 493 that a peace agreement was finally reached between Theodoric and Odovacar. It was negotiated by John, Bishop of Ravenna, and stated that Theodoric and Odovacar were to both occupy Ravenna and jointly rule over Italy. Ten days later Odovacar was killed at a banquet held jointly with Theodoric. Procopius writes of the event in The Wars of Justinian, The Gothic war: "And for some time they observed the agreement; but afterward [Theodoric] caught [Odovacar], as they say, plotting against him, and bidding him to a feast with treacherous intent slew him..." From That point on Theodoric had become the undisputed king of Italy, establishing the Ostrogothic Kingdom, headed at Ravenna, that would last until 553.

==== Fall of Ostrogothic Ravenna ====
In 552, a Byzantine army led by the general Narses defeated Totila in the Battle of Taginae, with the Gothic king killed in the battle. Subsequently, Narses conquered Ravenna without encountering any opposition, thereby ending a roughly half-century period of Ostrogothic rule of the city.

== Theodoric's Ravenna ==
=== Buildings and architecture ===
==== Basilica of Sant'Apollinare Nuovo ====
The Basilica of Sant'Apollinare Nuovo was the main Arian church of Theodoric's Ravenna. Immediately near Theodoric's palace, it was dedicated in 504 to Christ the Redeemer. The 9th-century historian Agnellus, in his description of the Basilica, tells of Theodoric's in particular imprint upon it says in Liber Pontificalis Ecclesiae Ravennatis "[Sant'Apollinaire Nuovo] in this city, which King Theodoric founded, which is called the Golden Heaven... Indeed in the apse, if you look closely, you will find the following written above the windows in stone letters: 'King Theodoric made this church from its foundations in the name of our Lord Jesus Christ.'"

The Basilica is noted especially for the numerous mosaics that adorn its interior. There is twenty six mosaic depiction of the Christological cycle that, while other iconographical depictions were known to exist at the time, there is not known of any that were as extensive as the one that was present in Theodoric's Sant' Apollinaire Nuovo. Also present in the church are 32 statues meant to represent, in a nonspecific manner, the biblical authors. Each one of the statues in their hands has either a book or a scroll, nine with the former and twenty-one with the latter. Each has different appearance characteristics different from their counterparts and none are named or labeled, meaning that they are not saints. There is also a depiction of Christ and in imperial regalia: He sits upon a gem studded throne draped in the imperial purple and gold. The halo above him and the cross are also covered in gems. Upon a throne beside him, the Virgin Mary who, though also on a similar jewel encrusted throne, is not adorned in the regalia of an empress.

==== Theodoric's Palace ====
Theodoric's Palace at Ravenna was one of many that he constructed around Italy, however, with Ravenna as his capital and main residence the palace there was the main palace by which he lived and ruled and was adorned as such. The Anonymus Valesianus tells that Theodoric "...completely finished the palace, but did not dedicate it." What this shows is that Theodoric, though he completed the palace, was not the one commissioned its original construction. Cassiodorus in his Orationum Reliquiae states "The marble surface shines with the same color as gems, the scattered gold gleams. .. , the gifts of mosaic work delineate the circling rows of stones; and the whole is adorned with marble hues where the waxen pictures are displayed."

==== Mausoleum of Theodoric ====
The Mausoleum of Theodoric was one of his crowning building achievements. The mausoleum itself was constructed during his lifetime and was described in the Anonymus Valesianus as such: "During his lifetime he had made himself a mausoleum of squared blocks of stone, a work of extraordinary size, and sought out a huge rock to place upon it." His goal seemed to echo that of the burial place of Mausolus of Halicarnassus, one of Jerome's seven wonders of the ancient world. The style of the building echoed the dual nature of Theodoric's rule. There is much debate as to whether the mausoleum is a "Roman" or "Gothic" monument and this was perhaps as Theodoric intended it, having himself to rule over both the Goths and Romans equally within his kingdom.

=== Religion and Tolerance in Theodoric's Ravenna ===
The Ostrogoths, though having power themselves, by no means supplanted the entire Roman population of Ravenna, Italy, or of the ruling administration. The distinction between Roman and Goth was made even more evident by the different sects of Christianity that they practiced: Catholic Christianity and Arianism respectively.

==== Arians and the Orthodoxy ====
The differences between Romans and Goths in Ostrogothic Ravenna were never as clearly defined as they were along religious lines. The Goths followed the Arian branch of Christianity, while the Romans practiced Orthodoxy. Both considered the other to be heretics. Theodoric, however, was the keystone in maintaining order amongst the peoples that he ruled, commanding respect and fear in equal measure from both Romans and Goths alike. Upon his taking of power the Orthodox bishops and leaders of Ravenna were allowed to keep their posts, but not had to enter into power sharing with Arian counterparts. In his Variae Cassiodorus has letters he penned for Theodoric that show his toleration as well as protection of the Orthodox Church. In one such letter Theodoric had Cassiodorus write, this time to Faustus, a Roman prefect, saying "'The Defensores of the Holy Church of Milan want to be enabled to buy as cheap as possible the things which they need for the relief of the poor; and they say that we have bestowed this favor on the Church of Ravenna. 'Your Magnificence will therefore allow them to single out some one merchant who shall buy for them in the market, without being subject to monopoly, siliquaticum, or the payment of gold-fee."

==== Toleration of the Jewish population ====
In line with his toleration of other Christian groups within his empire and in Ravenna in particular, Theodoric had a long history of tolerance when it came to the Jews of his empire and in his capital. There are numerous accounts of Jewish persecution throughout the Kingdom, all of which was dealt with in a manner of fairness by Theodoric. Cassiodorus tells us of these events in the letters he wrote for the King. He both allowed for the Jews of Genoa to rebuild and remodel their synagogue as well as assured them that the privileges awarded then since antiquity would remain in place. Rome and Ravenna had similar occurrences with their Jewish populations and Theodoric dealt with them accordingly. They both saw a major attack on much of their Jewish synagogues and population and in both cases Theodoric dealt with the Christians as the aggressors and requested that the attacks cease and placed blame for the attacks on them. In Ravenna, the pretense for the attack was that the Jews of the city had ridiculed Christians and even thrown holy water into the river. Theodoric responded by levying a fine on all Roman citizens of Ravenna to pay for the damages to the Jewish synagogues.

== Legacy of Theodoric ==
=== Theodoric's successors ===
Theodoric died in 526 and his kingdom was left to his then eight-year-old grandson Athalaric, who was under the auspices of his mother and regent Amalasuntha. She was Roman educated and sought to pass that on to her son. She is praised heavily by Cassiodorus in a letter to the Senate of Rome and Procopius describes her leadership skills saying "[Amalasuntha] proved to be endowed with wisdom and regard for justice in the highest degree, displaying to a great extent the masculine temper." The Goths of the court however were not attracted to the way in which she was raising her son and their King. They sought to give a more "barbarian" education to the young king – one that involved much more drinking and debauchery – and it eventually led to his death in 534. Amalasuntha, in the very next year, after a brief attempt at ruling herself with her cousin before he exiled her, was murdered. This murder gave Justinian the pretense by which he could launch his war in 535 that eventually destroyed the Gothic Kingdom and ended Ravenna's period of imperial aspirations.

=== A third great capital of Rome? ===
Theodoric's legacy on Ravenna remains to this day in the buildings he constructed and the improvements that he made to the city. Under Theodoric Ravenna became a center of education and culture, and anyone who wished an audience with Theodoric, had to travel to Ravenna to do so. Since the establishment of Constantinople it had become customary in the Roman Empire to show both Rome and Constantinople on coins. Theodoric introduced during his reign a new Rome-Ravenna political iconography and went so far as to have any land grants to be picked up by his soldiers be done in person, in Ravenna. C.L.R. Fletcher writes on the achievements of Theodoric: "Ravenna, however, remained Theodoric's capital...the thirty-six years of Theodoric's rule afford rather a pretty picture, a sort of Indian summer during which Italy recovered a good deal of prosperity on the eve of her final ruin."

He did not however achieve this goal of uplifting the city to the status held by Rome and Constantinople. Theodoric expended energy and treasure enriching Ravenna in an attempt to bring to it the status accorded to both cities. He constructed both religious and secular buildings in imitation of those in the great imperial cities, but, as in the imperial era, Ravenna's prestige was actively rivaled by that of Rome. To exemplify this fact, even during Theodoric's reign while silver coins were minted in Ravenna, gold coins were minted exclusively in Rome. Nevertheless, Fletcher cites Theodoric as one of the saviors of Roman culture: "His care for ancient buildings was exemplary; he enjoined the prefect to restore Pompey's theatre; he carried on the drainage of the Pomptine marshes, and he was a great restorer of aqueducts. Indeed, it is quite possible to maintain that but for 'this Goth,' the remains of classical antiquity, whether built or written, might have perished altogether in Italy."

== Bibliography ==
=== Primary sources ===
- Agnellus Liber Pontificalis Ecclesiae Ravennatis tr. Mango, Cyril A. The art of the Byzantine Empire, 312–1453; sources and documents. Englewood cliffs, N.J.: Prentice-Hall, 1972
- Anonymus Valesianus tr. Loeb Classical Library 1939. University of Chicago.
- Anonymus Valesianus tr. Deborah Mauskopf Delyannis, as cited it Ravenna in late antiquity. Cambridge: Cambridge University Press, 2010.
- Cassiodorus 'Orationum Reliquae'. Tr. Deborah Mauskopf Delyannis. Ravenna in late antiquity. Cambridge: Cambridge University Press, 2010.
- Cassiodorus 'Variae'. tr. Thomas Hogkin. Project Gutenberg.
- Jordanes 'Getica'. Tr. Charles C. Mierow. University of Calcagy.
- Procopius 'History of the Wars, The Gothic War' tr. H.B. Dewing. Project Gutenberg.

=== Secondary sources ===
- Bachrach, Bernard S.. Early medieval Jewish policy in Western Europe. Minneapolis: University of Minnesota Press, 1977 ISBN 0-8166-5698-3.
- Deliyannis, Deborah Mauskopf. Ravenna in late antiquity. Cambridge: Cambridge University Press, 2010 ISBN 0-521-83672-7.
- Dunlap, Thomas J., and Herwig Wolfram. History of the Goths. New and completely rev. from the 2nd German ed. Berkeley: University of California Press, 1988 ISBN 0-520-06983-8.
- Fletcher, Charles Robert Leslie. The Making of Western Europe: The Dark Ages: 300–1000 A.D.. London: Murray, 1912.
- Mango, Cyril A. The art of the Byzantine Empire, 312–1453; sources and documents. Englewood cliffs, N.J.: Prentice-Hall, 1972 ISBN 0-8020-6627-5.
- Metlich, Michael Andreas, and E. A. Arslan. The coinage of Ostrogothic Italy. London: Spink, 2004 ISBN 1-902040-58-9.
- Wolfram, Herwig. The Roman Empire and its Germanic peoples. Berkeley, California: Univ. of California Press, 2005 ISBN 0-520-08511-6.
