= Rio Covo =

Rio Covo may refer to:

- Rio Covo (Santa Eugénia), Barcelos, Portugal
- Rio Covo (Santa Eulália), Barcelos, Portugal
