= Agnodice =

4th-century BC Greek female physician

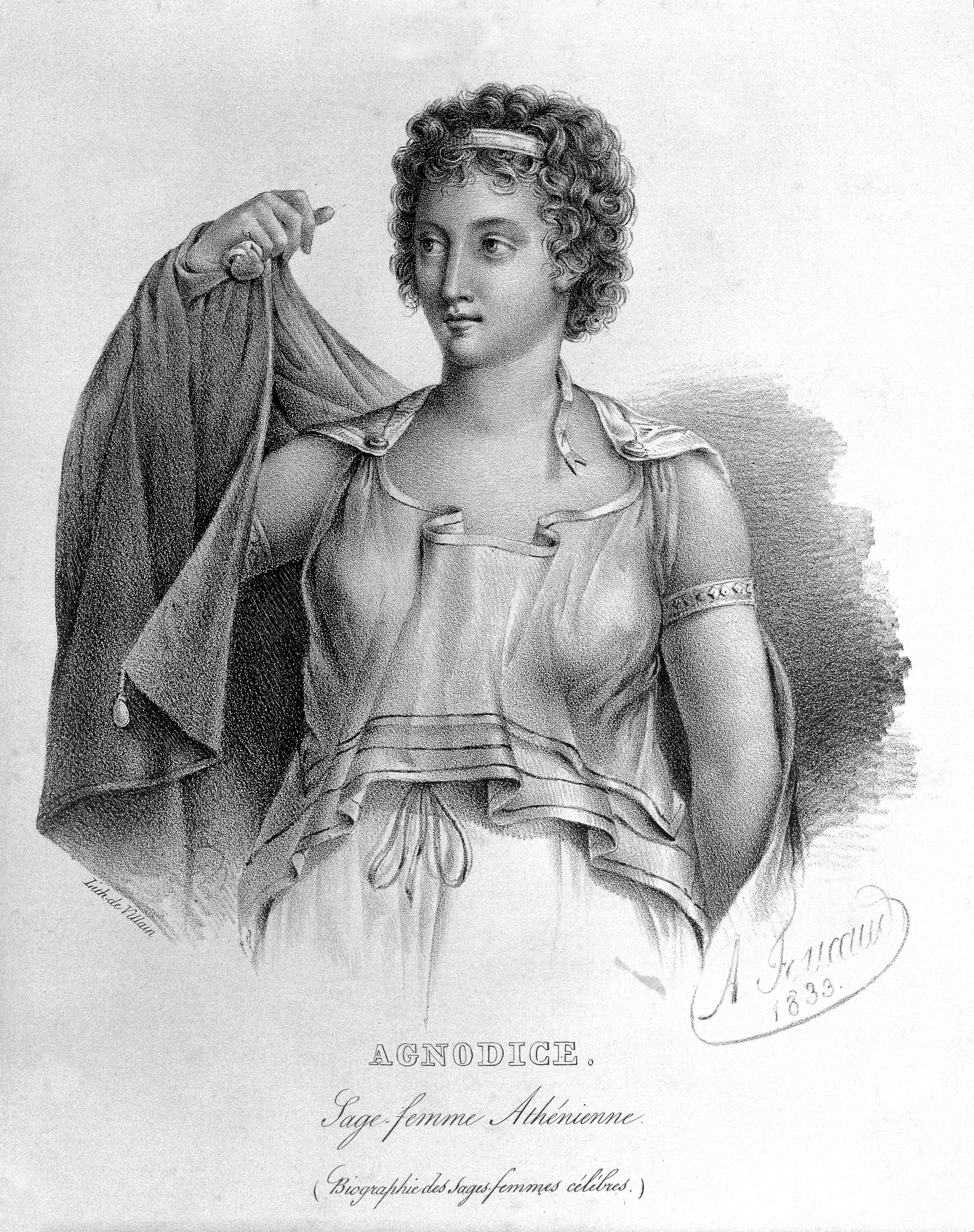
Agnodice in her disguise as a male physician, imagined here not as lifting her tunic to reveal her true sex, but as opening her outer garment to show that she has breasts.

Agnodice (Greek: Ἁγνοδίκη, pronounced [haŋnodíkɛː]; c. 4th century BCE) is a legendary figure said to be the first female midwife or physician in ancient Athens. Her story, originally told in the Fabulae (attributed to the Roman author Gaius Julius Hyginus), has been used to illustrate issues surrounding women in medicine and midwifery. Agnodice is not generally considered a historical figure, but her legend has influenced discussions about gender roles in medical professions.

According to Hyginus, Agnodice studied medicine under the famous physician Herophilus. Because Athenian laws prohibited women from practicing medicine, Agnodice disguised herself as a man to work as a physician. As her popularity grew among female patients, rival male physicians accused her of seducing her clients. During her trial, she revealed her identity by lifting her tunic in a gesture known as anasyrma, proving she was a woman. Although accused of illegally practicing medicine, Agnodice was defended by the women of Athens, who praised her skill and dedication. She was ultimately acquitted, and the law prohibiting female physicians was revoked.

== Life story ==
The story of Agnodice is known from a single ancient source, the Fabulae, a Latin handbook of mythology attributed to the Roman author Gaius Julius Hyginus. It is told by Hyginus in a list of stories about inventions, following descriptions of the medical innovations of Chiron, Apollo, and Asclepius. Agnodice's story is the longest in the section. It is one of only two featuring a female inventor – the other being the goddess Demeter, credited by Hyginus with the discovery of grain – and one of the few about a mortal rather than a god or child of a god.

According to Hyginus, Agnodice lived in ancient Athens, where at the time women were forbidden from studying medicine. In order to learn medicine, she disguised herself as a man, cutting her hair short, and studied under Herophilus in Alexandria. Having trained as a physician, Agnodice tried to assist women in labour, who would not consult with male practitioners out of shame. In one case, Agnodice was attempting to help a woman however, this woman believed her to be a man and refused treatment. Agnodice revealed her sex to the woman who then allowed Agnodice to treat her. Other doctors, growing jealous of Agnodice's success, accused her of seducing her patients and accused her patients of faking illness. On trial before the Areopagus, Agnodice lifted her clothes, revealing that she was a woman. She was charged with breaking the law which forbade women from practising medicine, but was defended by the wives of important Athenians whom she had treated. In response to this, the law was changed to allow women to practice medicine.

Hyginus describes Agnodice as an obstetrix. It is difficult to know how to translate this into English. Sarah Pomeroy has rendered it as "obstetrician", arguing that midwives existed in Athens in Agnodice's day but that Agnodice was distinguished by her formal education in medicine. However, Helen King notes that there was no "formal licensing system" for medics in the ancient world, and that it is anachronistic to divide ancient healers into the distinct categories of "midwife" and "obstetrician". Instead, she argues that the Latin obstetrix is etymologically comparable to the Anglo-Saxon midwife.

== Historicity ==
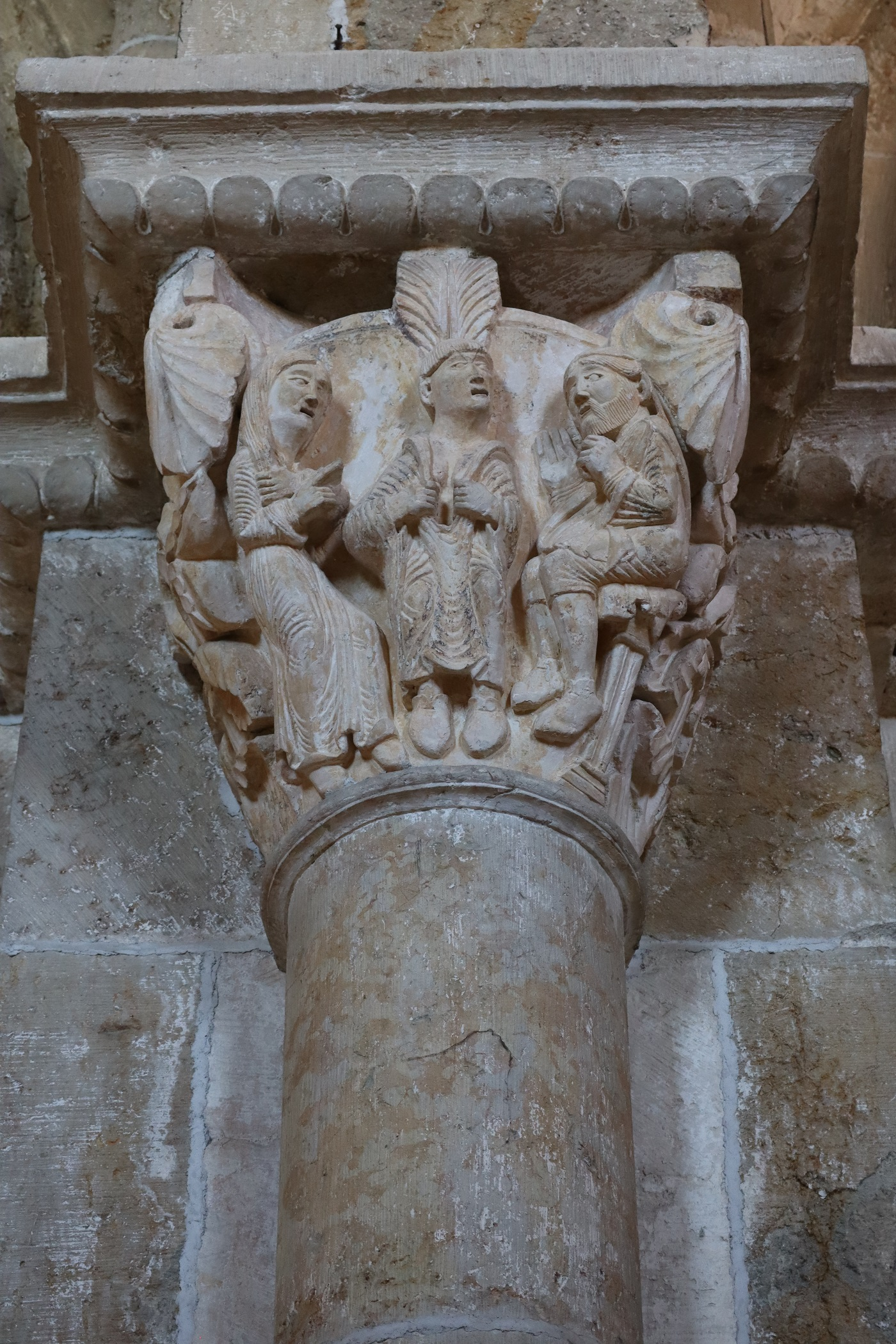
Saint Eugenia reveals her breasts to the judge. The legend of Saint Eugenia parallels the story of Agnodice told by Hyginus.

Modern scholars generally doubt that Agnodice was a real historical figure. Problems with accepting Agnodice as historical include questions over her date, and the implausibility of Hyginus' claim that there were no obstetrices in Athens before Agnodice, when literary and epigraphic evidence shows that midwives were known.

Hyginus claims that Agnodice was taught medicine by "a certain Herophilus" – generally identified with Herophilus of Chalcedon, an ancient physician known for his work on gynaecology who was credited with the discovery of the ovaries. If this is the case, Agnodice would have lived in the late fourth or early third century BCE. Some authors have historically denied that the Herophilus of the Agnodice story was Herophilus of Chalcedon, however, arguing that Hyginus' description of him as "a certain Herophilus" suggests that this was not the famous Herophilus, and that Herophilus of Chalcedon worked in Egypt while Agnodice was Athenian. Helen King notes that, given the historical Herophilus' association with midwifery, he was "simply the most appropriate teacher possible for Agnodice".

Those who believe in the historicity of Agnodice have proposed two different explanations for the lack of midwives in Athens before her. The first theory is that there were no midwives prior to Agnodice; alternatively, it has been proposed that there were earlier midwives but they had been forbidden by law from practising. This second theory has been elaborated over time, with Kate Hurd-Mead, in 1938, proposing that women had been forbidden from practising medicine because they had been accused of performing abortions. This version of the story has been repeated by subsequent authors, such as Margaret Alic in 1986, and Elizabeth Oakes in her Encyclopedia of World Scientists in 2007.

The various elements of the story of Agnodice are paralleled in other Greco-Roman stories. For instance, in Hyginus' version of the myth of Procris and Cephalus, Procris disguises herself as a man and reveals herself to Cephalus by lifting her tunic. Groups of women lifting their skirts also appear in myth (as in Plutarch's story of Bellerophon and the Lycian women) and history (in stories told by Herodotus and Diodorus Siculus). If the story of Agnodice is interpreted in this context rather than as historical fact, Helen King argues that the two occurrences of skirt-lifting in the story function first to emphasise Agnodice's similarity with the women she treats, and second her difference from the men of Athens. The broad arc of Agnodice's story – disguising herself as a man, being accused of immoral conduct, and exposing herself to prove her sex and her innocence – also parallels the legend of the early Christian martyr Eugenia.

== Influence on women in medicine ==
The story of Agnodice has been invoked since the sixteenth century to provide precedents for a range of gender options within the medical profession. Thus she was used both in the peak of men-midwifery in the eighteenth century and in women's struggle to enter the medical profession in the nineteenth century. Elizabeth Cellier, the seventeenth century "Popish midwife", positioned herself as a modern Agnodice. Although she appears in a list of 'Who discovered/invented what', she is represented more as someone who bridges the gap between the knowledge of male doctors ("a certain Herophilus") and the delivery of this knowledge to women who are embarrassed to show their bodies to a male doctor. However, others have taken the story of Agnodice as a negative example: Augustus Kinsley Gardner, for instance, in 1851 delivered a lecture arguing that "literally, no improvement was made" in the "many centuries" where midwifery was a women's profession, comparing Agnodice to the 19th century abortionist Madame Restell.

When Hyginus authored this fable of Agnodice, he wrote a story of a woman who performed as a man in order to practice medicine. Monica Green considers this to be one of the earliest depictions of gender performance. Agnodice did not rely on her innate characteristics as a woman which in the end helped her gain knowledge that she would not have had she not acted like a man. Green further states that this story shows the impacts of both genders. Agnodice had to play the part of a man to learn the medicine but could then use her knowledge as a woman to treat her female patients. It is also made apparent that male physicians at the time could be prone to oversights because they worked from the knowledge of mostly male conditions. Agnodice provides a different perspective as a woman and could get past the shame her female patients would feel had they been discussing their ailments with a male physician. This was used as a reminder by Athenian women in Agnodice's trial where they defended her practice of medicine.
