= Gnaeus Domitius Philippus =

Roman eques

Gnaeus Domitius Philippus was a Roman eques who held a number of military and civilian positions during the first quarter of the third century. Philippus has also been identified in Christian legend as the father of Saint Eugenia of Rome.

== Career ==
An inscription from Rome, but now lost, attests that Philippus was praefectus vigilum, or commander of the night watch, in 241. A number of papyri have been recovered from Egypt mentioning Philippus; Guido Bastianini interprets these as evidence he was praefectus or governor of Roman Egypt between those dates; while Reinmuth believes he was dux, or commander of troops, in 241 before being appointed governor of Egypt the following year. While the primary concern of the governor of Egypt was to safeguard the harvest and delivery of grain to the populace of Rome, he had other responsibilities that was not normally handled by a military official. For example, on 17 March 242 a declaration of birth known as a professio was made before him. Another surviving example is a petition addressed to Philippus dated 1 January 242, where the petitioner states she had applied to him for bonorum possessio. Notes John Rea, "Here too he is seen performing an administrative, not a military duty."

Nevertheless, John Rea points out that the one instance where Philippus is identified as praefectus aegyptus depends on a restoration of the text, where pr[aef(ectum) vigil(um) ducem] could also be restored. Military officials sometimes were forced to assume civilian tasks by the populace, so it is possible Philippus was never appointed governor. Peter J. Parsons agrees with this theory, pointing out that Philippus was in Egypt at the time Gordian III initiated his Persian War: "war broke out in 241; the emperor opened the temple of Janus and set out for the front in 242," as well as similarities to an earlier man put in charge of Roman Egypt about the time of war with Persia, Marcus Aurelius Zeno Januarius. He admits that Philippus' presence in Egypt at the outbreak of hostilities poses a problem, only to note "the outbreak cannot have come as a surprise. The Persians had raided Roman territory in previous years -- Nisibis and Carrhae under Maximin, Dura Europos in 238. And it is at least interesting that Philippus ... disappears from Egypt about the time at which the Roman advance was beginning.

The historical facts of his life after he left Egypt are unknown.

== Legend ==
In the version of the life of St. Eugenia presented in the Golden Legend, when Philippus was appointed governor of Egypt, he brought with him to Egypt his wife Claudia and his children Avitus, Sergius, and Eugenia. While there, Eugenia converted to Christianity and, disguising herself in men’s clothing as a monk, entered a monastery. While as a monk a noble woman propositioned her, and upon being rejected the noble woman accused Eugenia of propositioning her and had her haled before Philippus the governor. In the course of the trial, Eugenia revealed her identity, found innocent, and the noblewoman punished. Afterwards she converted her family, and Philippus left his posting to become bishop of Egypt.

There are a number of implausible facts in this story, chief amongst them the fact Philippus was never "bishop of Egypt" -- Heraclas is attested Patriarch of Alexandria from 232 to 248 -- as well as elements of Märchen (e.g. AT 883 B — The seducer punished). It cannot be easily determined how the 3rd century saint came to be associated with this eques.

Political offices
Preceded by Lucius Lucretius Annianus	Prefectus of Aegyptus; 241-242	Succeeded by Aurelius Basileus
