= Legend of Hilaria =

Coptic Christian romance

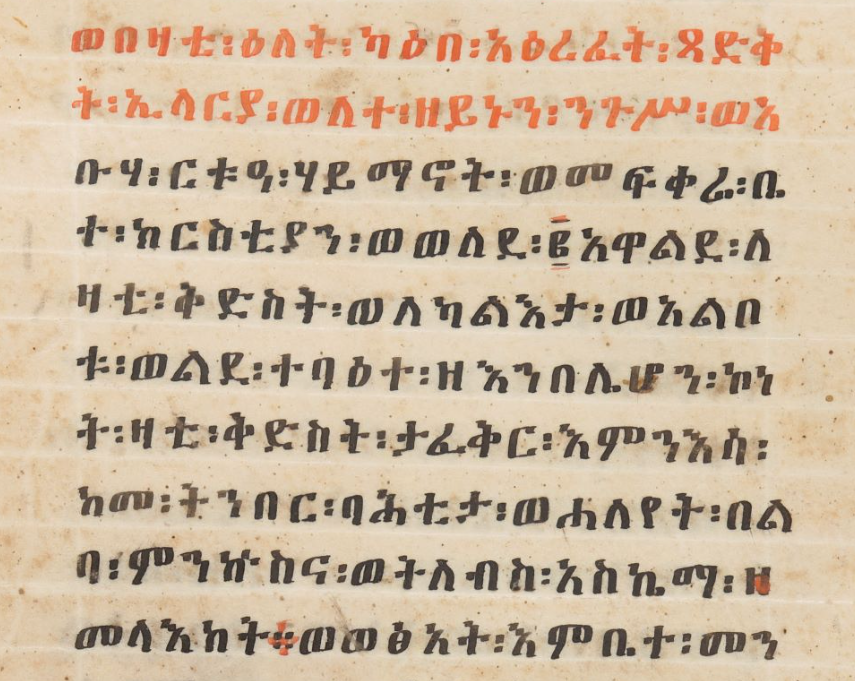
The Legend in Ethiopic. Hilaria's name (ኢላርያ) appears in red in the second line. From a manuscript of 1655.

The Legend of Hilaria is a Coptic romance, possibly a Christian version of the pagan Tale of Bentresh. It was written between the 6th and 9th centuries. During the Middle Ages, it was translated into Syriac, Arabic and Ethiopic. It tells the tale of Hilaria, daughter of the Roman emperor Zeno, who disguised herself as a man to become a monk and later heals her sister of an ailment. The tale was incorporated into the synaxaries of the Oriental Orthodox churches, and Hilaria came to be celebrated as a saint.

== Date and authorship ==
Judging by its lack of historical truth regarding Zeno, his family and his reign, it is likely that the Legend was written no earlier than about 500. It had achieved a final form by 848, the date of the only complete Coptic manuscript. The Syriac translation likewise dates to the 9th century.

The text is presented as written by the abbot Pambo, who also plays a part in the story. The abbot is in fact a fictional character based on the 4th-century Saint Pambo. The author of the Legend is therefore anonymous.

== Manuscripts and translations ==
There is only one complete Coptic manuscript on parchment, now Pierpont Morgan M.583. It is a dated hagiographic miscellany that was completed on 8 February 848. There are a further four fragmentary manuscript copies, three on parchment and one on papyrus. One fragment contains a shorter version of the story, but it does not appear to be an older version. All the surviving Coptic manuscripts are in the Sahidic dialect.

During the Middle Ages, the Legend was translated into Syriac, Arabic and Ethiopic. The Syriac translation is the earliest, dating to the 9th century. There are six manuscripts of the Syriac text, showing little variation. The earliest surviving copy of an Arabic version is from the 13th or 14th century. There are four different Arabic versions. The long Arabic script version, from the Copto-Arabic Synaxary, is a translation of the Coptic. There is a short version that is an abridgement of this, although it also diverges in some details. There is also a short translation from the Coptic that is known from a single manuscript copied in Garshuni (that is, Arabic in Syriac script). This was the earliest version known in Europe. A longer Garshuni version translated from the Syriac is known from at least five manuscripts, in one of which it is titled History of the Emperor Zeno. The Ethiopic version is a translation of the long Arabic and preserved in the Ethiopian Synaxary.

No Greek version is known.

== Genre and sources ==
The Legend is a hagiographic romance rather than historical record. Although it refers to historical figures and real locations, its central narrative and characters are, in Wilfong's words, "demonstrably ahistorical". Zeno, for instance, is not known to have had a daughter. From the prologue, it appears that the author was "aware of the literary genre that he [was] tackling", that "God had provided believers not only with preachers but also with authors, intended for their guidance."

Oscar Lemm first proposed that the Legend of Hilaria was based on the Neo-Middle Egyptian Tale of Bentresh, which dates from perhaps as early as the Kushite 25th Dynasty in the 8th century BC or as late as the Ptolemaic Dynasty. There are, however, major differences between the two stories. Parallels exist between Hilaria and figures known from Greek hagiography, such as Eugenia, Pelagia, Euphrosyne and Apolinaria.

== Synopsis ==
=== Coptic text ===
In the Legend, Hilaria—whose name means "joy" and is a rendering of Bentresh, "daughter of joy"—is the eldest daughter of the Roman emperor Zeno. At eighteen years of age, disguising herself as a cavalryman and without her father's permission, she travels to Alexandria in Egypt, from where she is led first to the monastery of Saint Mina and then to the desert of Scetis by a deacon named Theodore. There she meets Pambo, who advises her to go the Enaton, where life is less harsh. Hilaria stays at Scetis and is accepted as a monk with the name Hilarion. She discusses the scriptures with the philosopher Anba Martyrius. After three years, God reveals to Pambo that Hilarion is in fact a woman. He tells her not to reveal this to the other monks, who take her for a beardless eunuch. The text explains that her breasts were underdeveloped because of her ascetic practices and that she did not menstruate.

Nine years later, her seriously ill sister Theopiste is sent by Zeno to the stratelates of Alexandria, who brings her to Scetis to be healed or exorcised of a demon. Hilaria weeps uncontrollably upon seeing her. She kisses her and sleeps next to her in her cell or grotto until she is healed. After a week, Theopiste returns to Constantinople and reveals the monk's unusual behaviour to her father, Zeno is scandalized. He summons the monk to Constantinople, where Hilaria reveals her identity. There is a tender family reunion before she returns to Scetis to continue living as a monk. Twelve years later, she dies and is buried fully clothed.

Only after her death does it become widely known that Hilarion was in fact a woman. Zeno sends a large annual gift to the monastery.

=== Variations ===
The long Arabic version does not contain the revelation to Pambo (Arabic Bamfu), while in the short version Hilaria (not God) reveals herself to Pambo. In the short Arabic version, Pambo meets her in Alexandria, the role of Theodore is nixed and Hilaria confirms her identity to her parents by showing them distinguishing marks on her body.

In the short Arabic and Syriac versions, the role of the strateletes of Alexandria is nixed. The Syriac version contains a formulaic exordium on the value of hearing of the great deeds of the saints, the unworthiness of the author and his refusal to be silent. It also gives Hilaria traits common to heroes: her birth was an answer to prayer and she is of fair complexion. At Scetis, she identifies herself as "John the eunuch, a slave freed by my master". Theopiste stays at Scetis for five years. Finally, the Syriac version has a different ending. After the monks realize she is related to Zeno, she leaves the monastery to live in isolation in a grotto, to avoid becoming conceited. She dies there.

== Hagiography ==
Despite her purely legendary origins, Hilaria was later recognized as a saint in the liturgical calendar of the eastern churches. Her feast day in the Coptic church is 21 Tobi, which is also the Feast of the Dormition. In the Ethiopian calendar, it falls on the 21st of the month of Ter. In the Syriac Orthodox Church, it falls on 27 November or 13 January.

The Legend is a miaphysite work, which explains its positive portrayal of Zeno, who issued the pro-miaphysite Henotikon in 482.

== Bibliography ==
- Budge, E. A. Wallis, ed. (1928). The Book of the Saints of the Ethiopian Church, Volume 2. Cambridge: Cambridge University Press.
- Drescher, James, ed. (1947). Three Coptic Legends: Hilaria, Archellites, the Seven Sleepers (PDF). Cairo: Imprimerie de l'Institut Francais d'Archéologie Orientale. Archived from the original (PDF) on 2011-11-15.
- Fiey, Jean Maurice (2004). Saints Syriaques. Princeton: Darwin Press.
- Haas, Christopher J. (2018). "Hilaria, Legend of". In Nicholson, Oliver (ed.). The Oxford Dictionary of Late Antiquity, Volume 1: A–I. Oxford: Oxford University Press. p. 720. ISBN 978-0-19-881624-9.
- O'Leary, De Lacy (1930). "Litterature Copte". Dictionnaire d'archéologie chrétienne et de liturgie. Vol. 9, Part 2. Paris: Librairie Letouzey et Ané. col. 1599–1635.
- van Esbroek, Michel [in French] (1991). "Hilaria, Saint". In Aziz Suryal Atiya (ed.). The Coptic Encyclopedia. Vol. 4. New York: Macmillan Publishers. cols. 1230b–1232a.
- Wensinck, A. J. [in Dutch], ed. (1913). Legends of Eastern Saints Chiefly from Syriac Sources, Volume II: The Legend of Hilaria. Leiden: E. J. Brill.
- Wilfong, Terry G. (2001). "Coptic literature". In Donald B. Redford (ed.). The Oxford Encyclopedia of Ancient Egypt. Oxford: Oxford University Press. pp. 295–302. ISBN 978-0-19-510234-5.
