= Mausoleum of Theodoric =

Ancient monument in Ravenna, Italy

UNESCO World Heritage Site
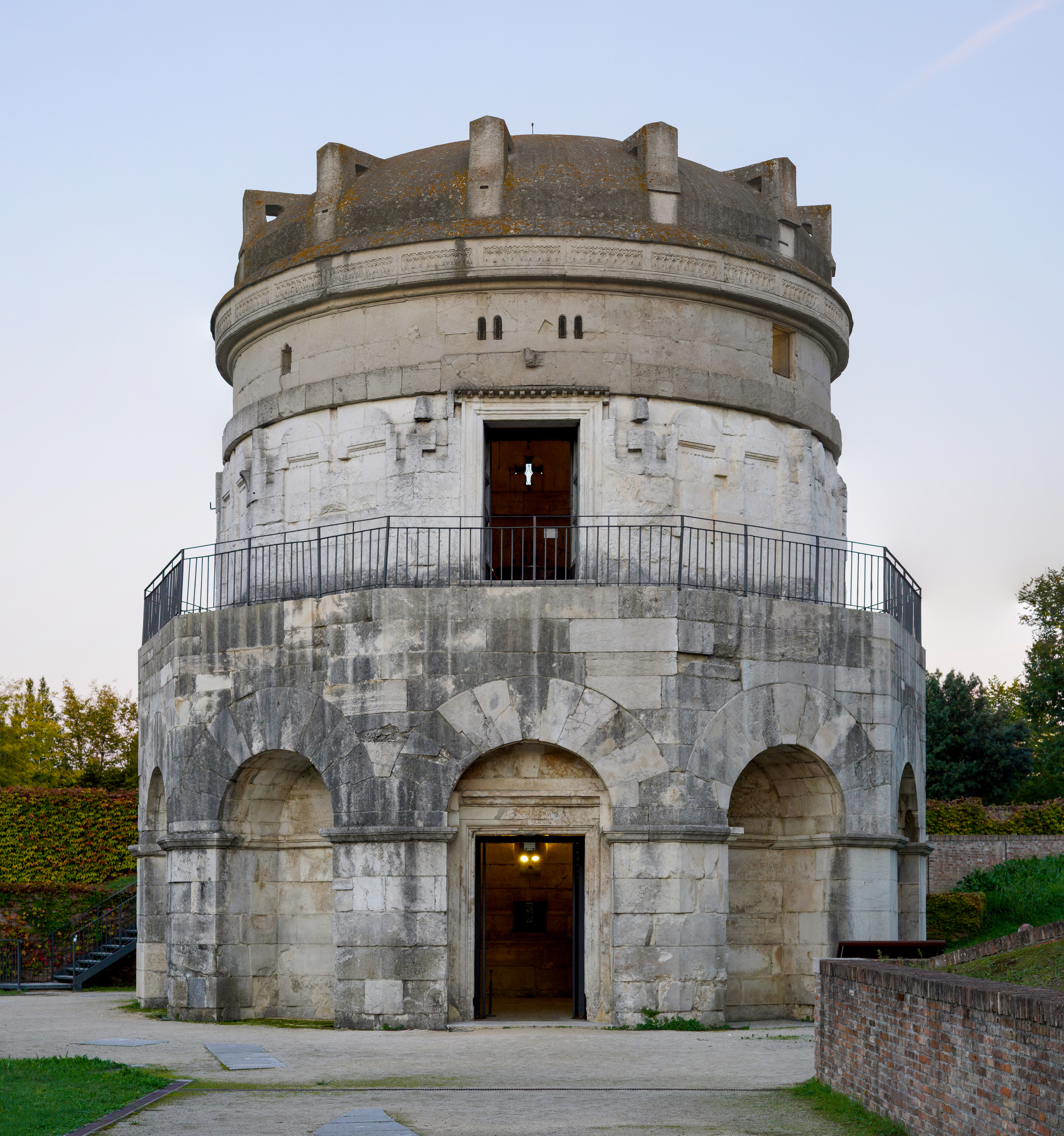

- Location within Emilia-Romagna Location within Italy
- Location: Ravenna, Italy
- Part of: Early Christian Monuments of Ravenna
- Criteria: Cultural: i, ii, iii, iv
- Reference: 788-007
- Inscription: 1996 (20th Session)
- Area: 0.014 ha (0.035 acres)
- Buffer zone: 21.6 ha (53 acres)
- Coordinates: 44°25′30″N 12°12′33″E

The Mausoleum of Theodoric (Italian: Mausoleo di Teodorico) is an ancient monument just outside Ravenna, Italy. It was built in AD 520 by Theodoric the Great, king of the Ostrogoths, as his future tomb.

== Description ==
The mausoleum's current structure consists of two decagonal orders, one above the other, made of Istrian stone sourced from a quarry approximately 400 kilometres (249 mi) away by land journey. The mausoleum's roof consists of a single carved stone 10 metres (33 ft) in diameter weighing 230 tonnes. A niche leads down to a room that was probably a chapel for funeral liturgies; an external stair leads to the upper floor. Located in the centre of the upper floor is a fragmentary ancient Roman porphyry tub, likely from a bath complex, in which Theodoric was buried. His remains were removed during Byzantine rule, when the mausoleum was turned into a Christian oratory. In the late 19th century, silting from a nearby rivulet that had partly submerged the mausoleum was drained and excavated.

== Recognition ==
It was inscribed with seven other "Early Christian Monuments and Mosaics of Ravenna" buildings as one of the UNESCO World Heritage Sites in 1996. According to the ICOMOS evaluation, "the significance of the mausoleum lies in its Gothic style and decoration, which owe nothing to Roman or Byzantine art, although it makes use of the Roman stone construction technique of opus quadratum, which had been abandoned four centuries before" and in the fact that "it is the only surviving example of a tomb of a king of this period."

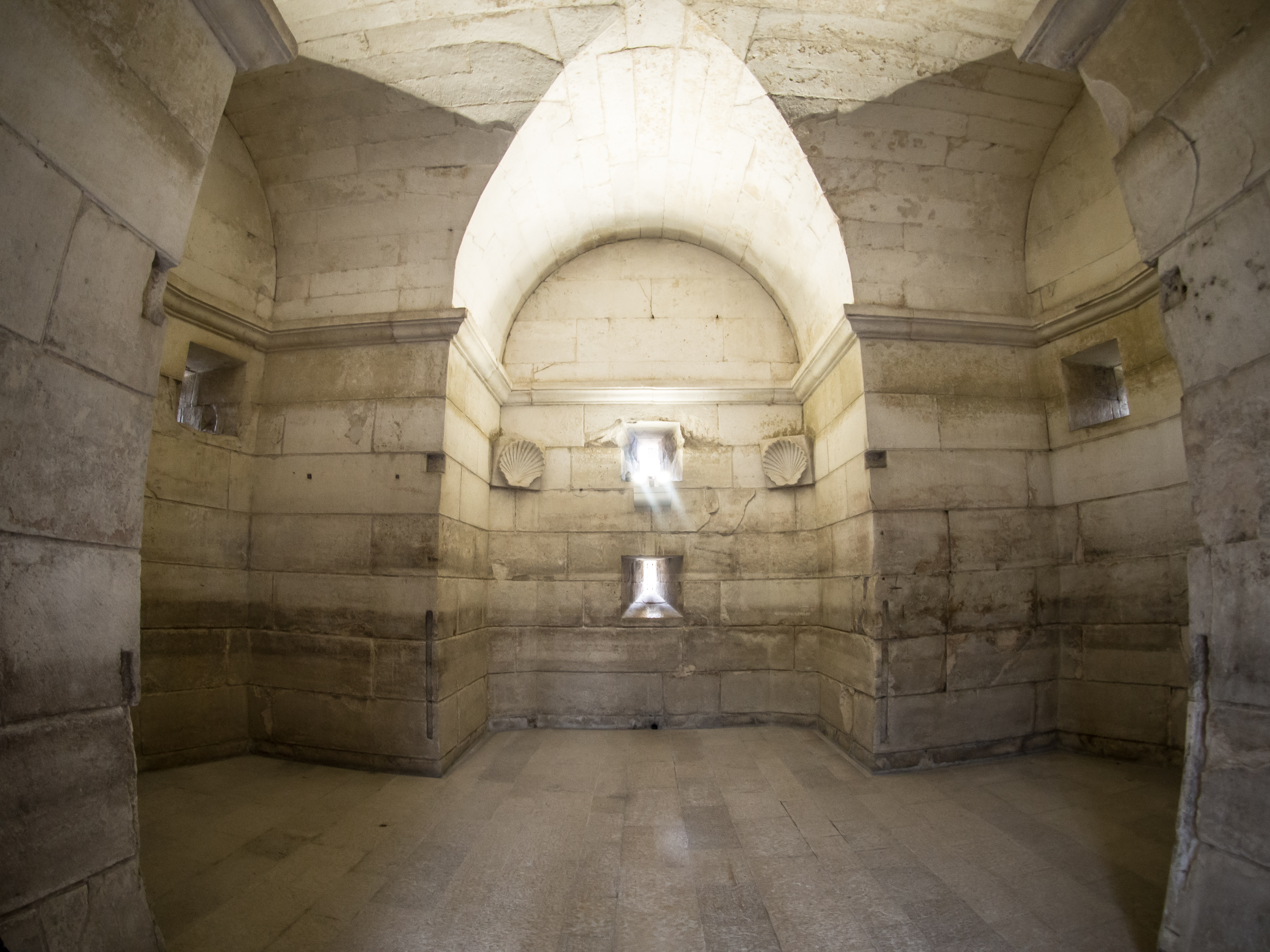
Inside lower level

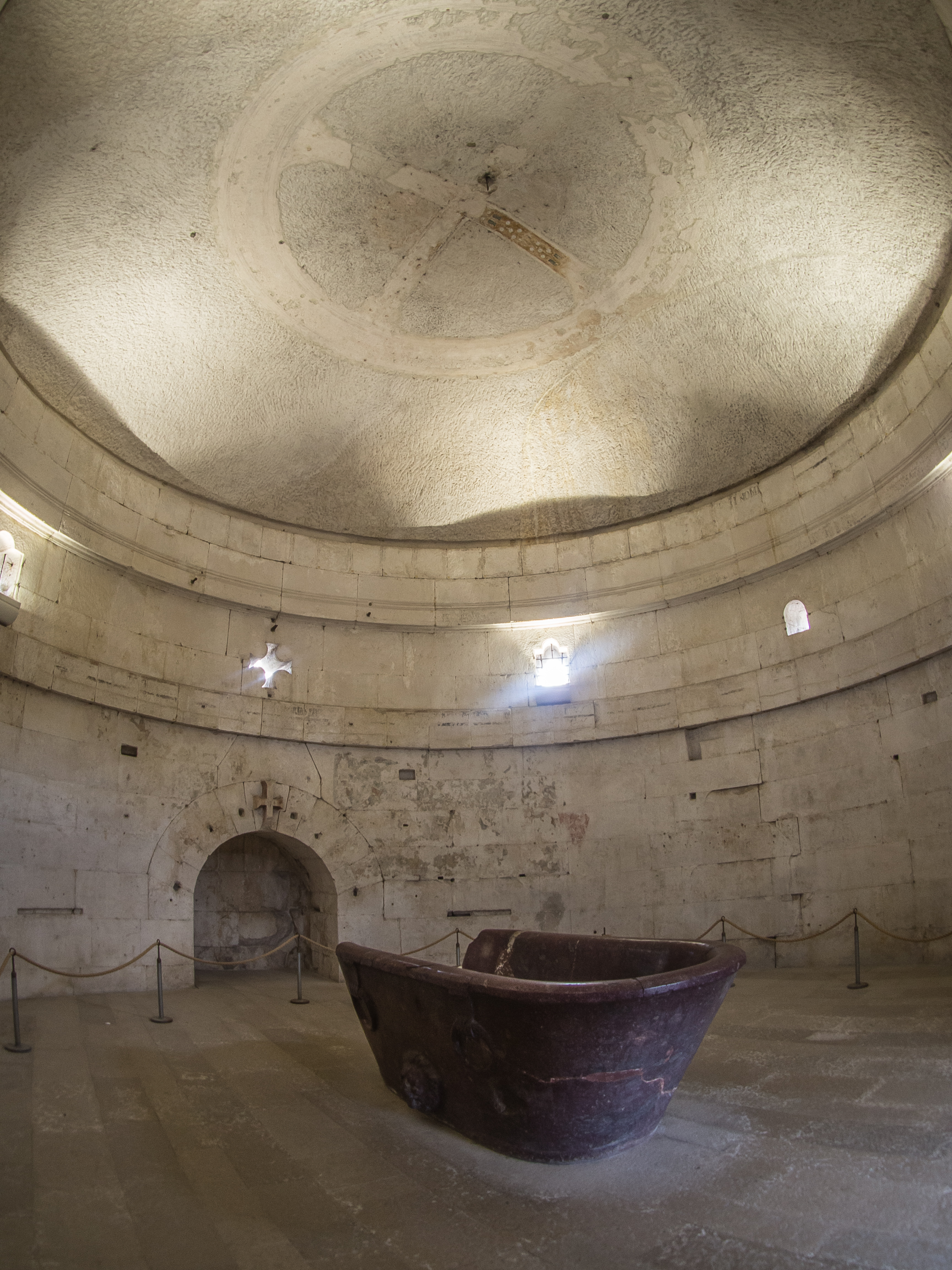
Inside top level

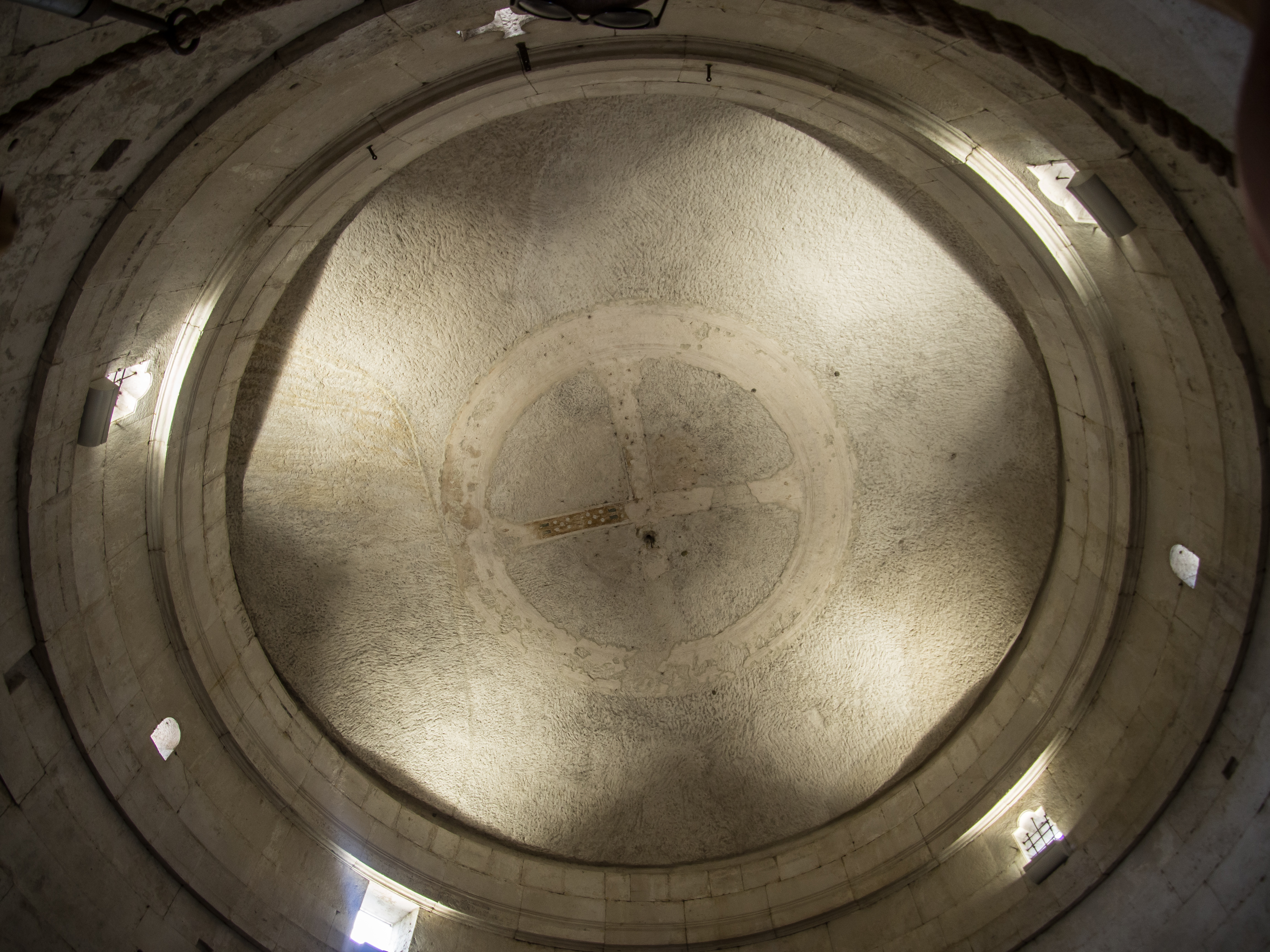
Inside top level with cracked roof stone

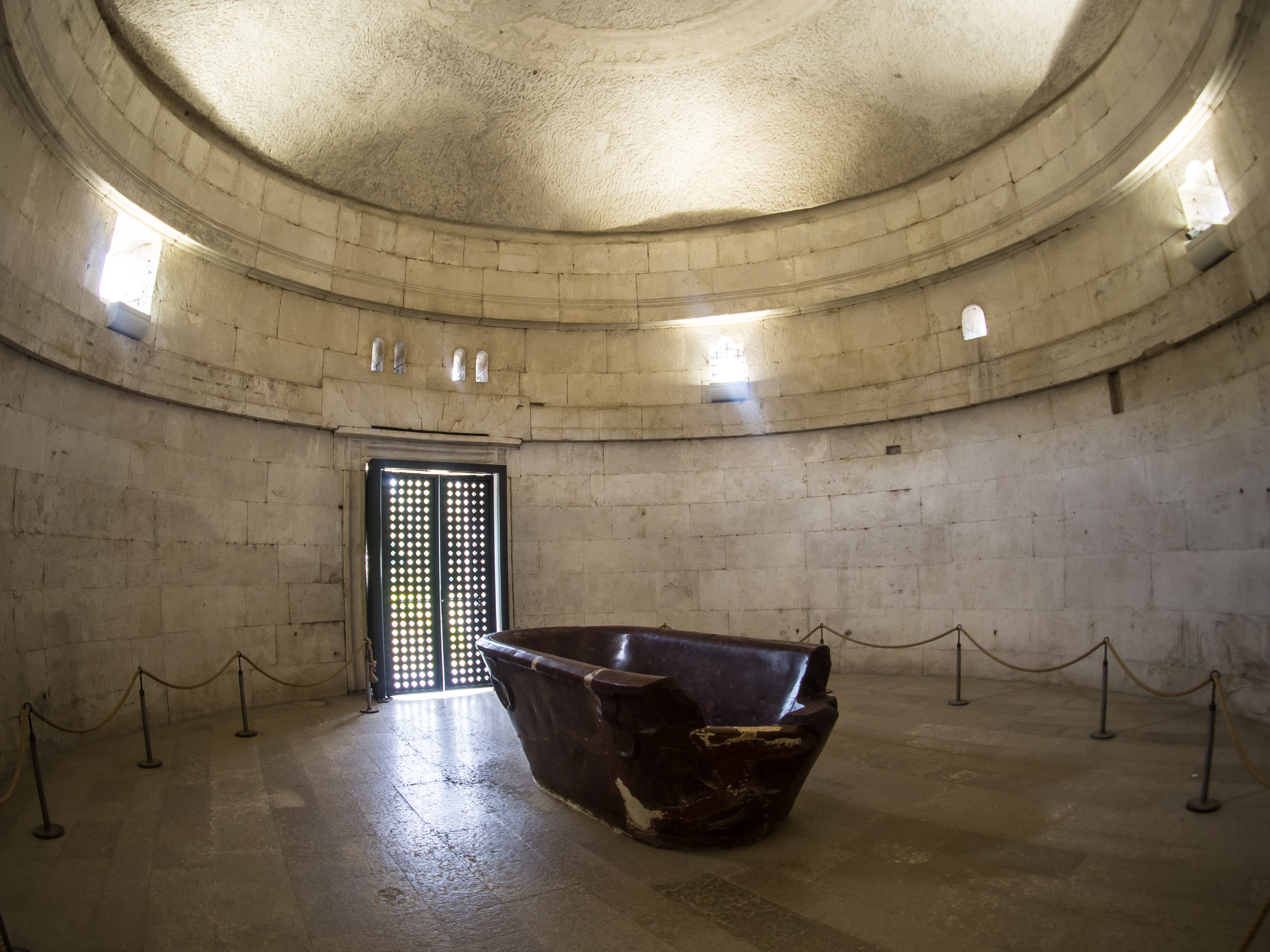
Inside top level

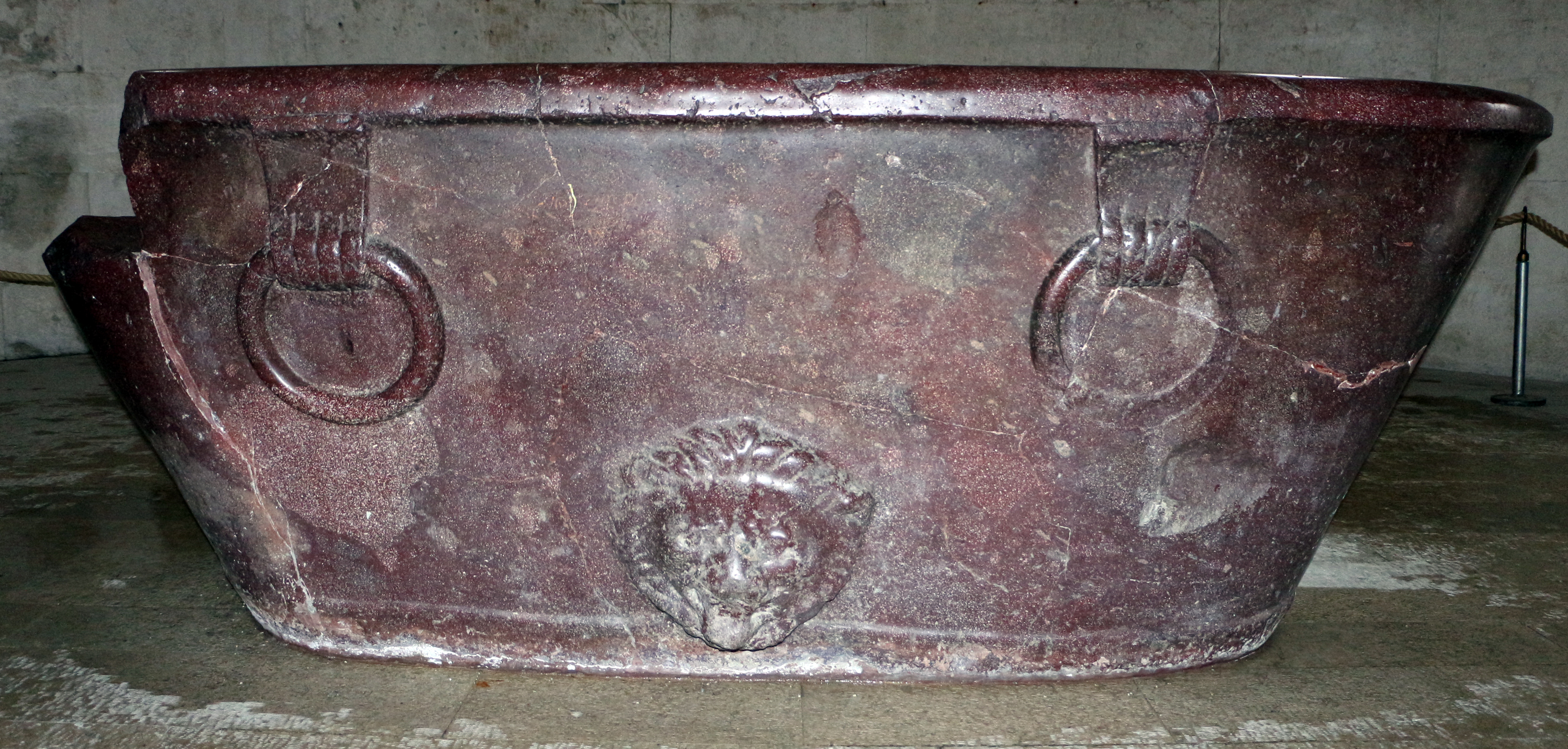
Porphyry tub used by Theodoric as sarcophagus

== See also ==
- Ostrogothic Ravenna
- Palace of Theodoric now lost, also in Ravenna
- Sparlösa Runestone
- Haus Potsdam
- Early medieval domes
