= Palace of Theodoric =

Structure in Ravenna, Italy

Coordinates: 44°24′58″N 12°12′17″E

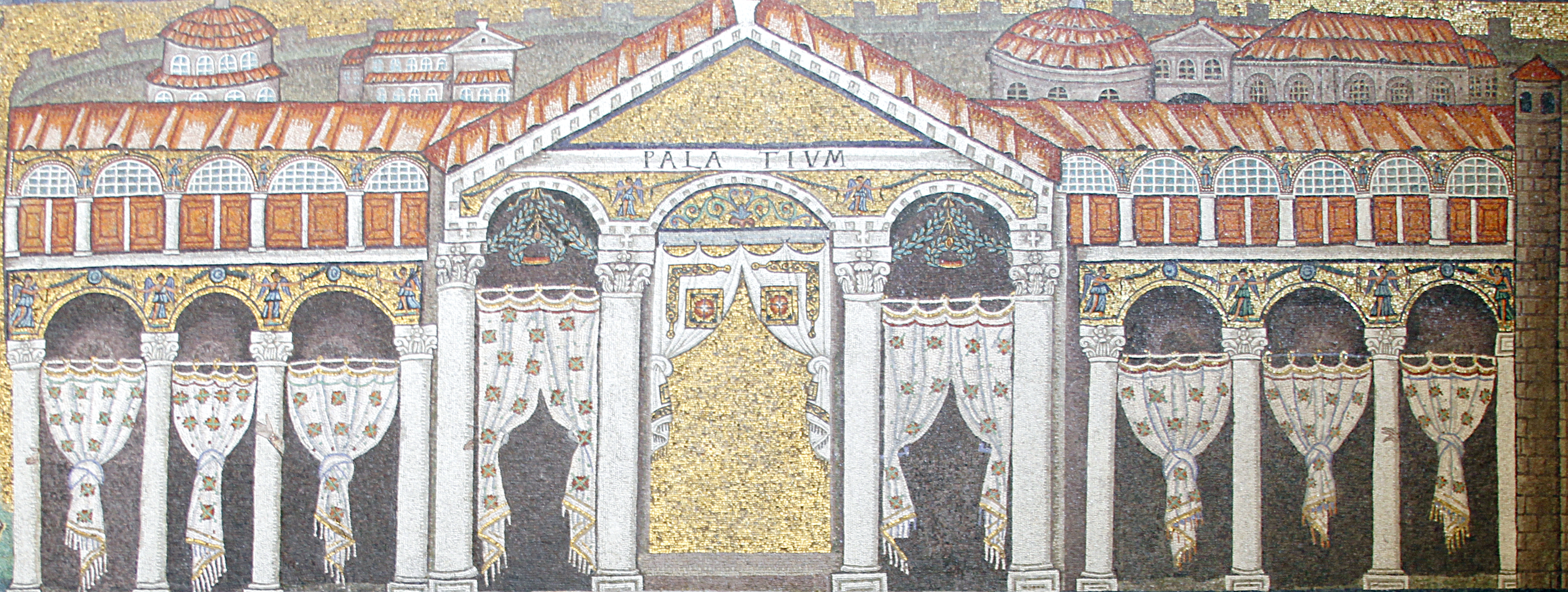
Mosaic depiction of the front of Theodoric's Palace on the upper part of the south wall of the nave of San Apollinare Nuovo in Ravenna.

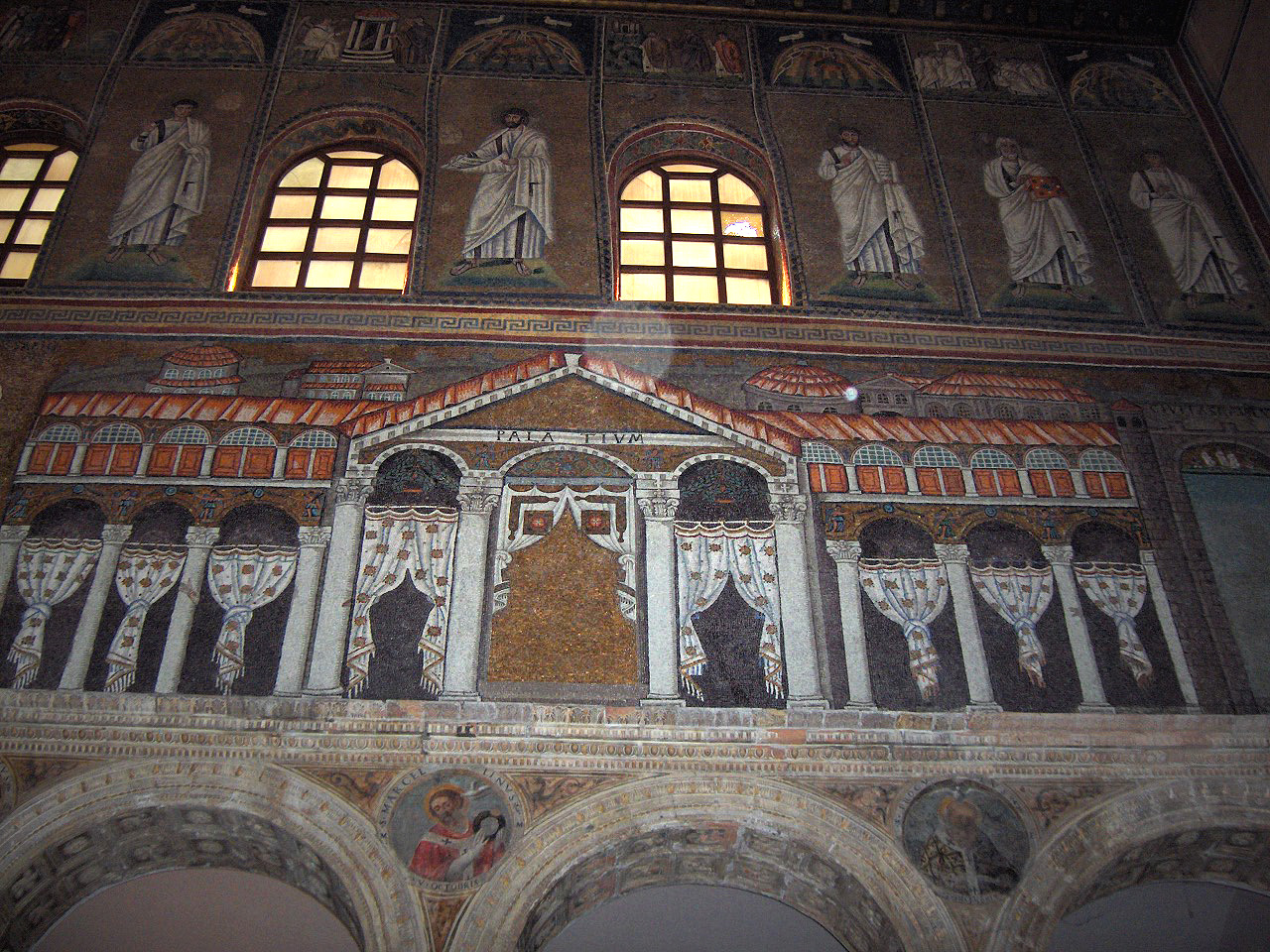
Another view of the mosaic in San Apollinare Nuovo in Ravenna.

The palace of Theodoric was a structure in Ravenna, Italy, that was the residence of the Ostrogothic ruler and king of Italy Theodoric the Great (d. 526), who was buried in the nearby Mausoleum of Theodoric.

Both the location of the former palace and a large part of the ground plan can be gathered from excavations of the remains of foundations and walls carried out by Corrado Ricci in the period between 1907 and 1911 in the garden of the Monghini family and in the adjacent area between the Viale Farini and Via Alberoni. Ricci identified the building on the basis of lead sewer pipes on which the name of Theodoric was engraved. The palace lay behind San Apollinare Nuovo, Theodoric's cathedral church, and the partial building which is now referred to as the "so-called Palace of Theodoric", which was erroneously believed to be a remnant of the palace for a long time. The lead pipes revealed by the excavation, along with other finds, are kept in a dedicated room of the National Museum, Ravenna.

A large-scale mosaic depiction of the palace, located on the upper part of the southern interior wall of San Apollinare Nuovo and dating from the time of Theodoric, allows the palace to be reconstructed to a certain extent. From that, the palace seems not to have been very large. The relevant mosaic in San Apollinare Nuovo, which probably originally depicted Theodoric sitting on a horse in the centre and members of his court or his family in the two flanking colonnades, was altered after Theodoric's death in 526. Because he was an Arian, the Roman Church considered him a heretic. After his death, therefore, all images that depicted him and other people were removed from the mosaic and covered with other images. Of the original figures, the hands still remain on the columns of the palace.

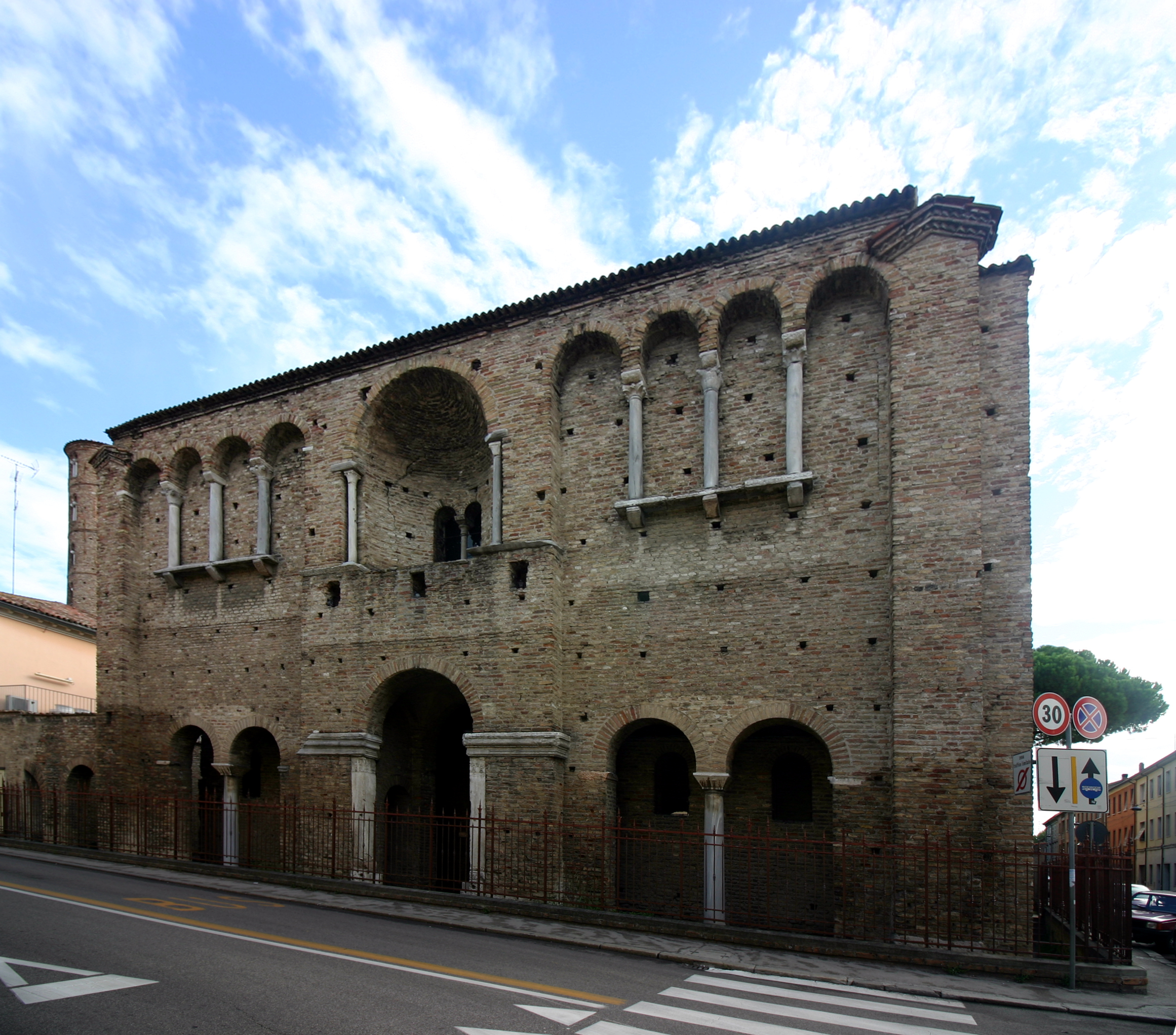
The so-called Palace of Theodoric in Ravenna.

In the excavations, among other things, some remnants of the palace's mosaic floor were discovered. The mosaics were brought to the "so-called Palace of Theodoric" in 1923, where they were set up in a display room. In the display room, on the upper level, a poster with a plan of the excavated foundations was displayed as well.

Building material was taken from the ruins of Theodoric's palace by Charlemagne, including several columns that he reused in the construction of his Palatine Chapel in Aachen. The columns, which served mostly as decoration and had no structural role, were removed by Napoleon and displayed in the Louvre. Some of the columns were later returned to Aachen.
