= Jacob Micyllus =

German Renaissance humanist and teacher (1503-1558)

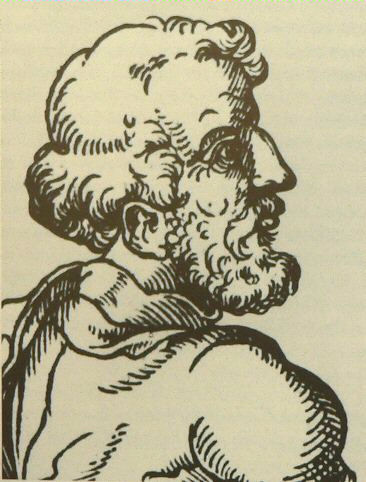
Jacob Micyllus

Jacob Micyllus, (6 April 1503 – 28 January 1558) was a German Renaissance humanist and teacher, who conducted the city's Latin school in Frankfurt and held a chair at the University of Heidelberg, during times of great cultural stress in Germany.

Micyllus was born Jakob Moltzer in Strasbourg. From 1518 to 1522 he studied in Erfurt, then at the end of 1522 went to Philipp Melanchthon in Wittenberg. From 1524, aged only twenty-one, he directed the city Latin school at Frankfurt, on Melanchthon's recommendation. But he was not at ease with the radical Reformation in Frankfurt from 1526 and found a place as professor in Heidelberg, January 1533. He died in Heidelberg.

== Selected works ==
- Varia epigrammata graeca & latina & alia carmina graca, Basel 1538
- Sylva variorum carminum
- Commentataria in Homerum, Basel 1541
- Annotationes in Joh. Bocatii genealogiam Deorum, Basel 1532
- Scholia ad Martialis obscuriores aliquot locos
- Ratio examinandorum versuum
- Calendarium
- Carmen elegiacum de ruina arcis Heidelbergensis, quae facta est 1537
- Annotationes in Ovidium, & in Lucanum
- Arithmetica logistica
- Euripidis vita, Basel 1558
- De Tragaedia & ejus partibus
- Traductio aliquot operum Luciani cum scholiis
- Annotationes in Euripidem, Basel 1562
- Urbis Francofurdi gratulatio ad Caronum, Leipzig 1530
