= Basilica of Sant'Apollinare Nuovo =

Basilica church in Ravenna, Italy, erected by king Theodoric the Great in 6th century CE

New Basilica of Saint Apollinaris Basilica di Sant'Apollinare Nuovo (in Italian)
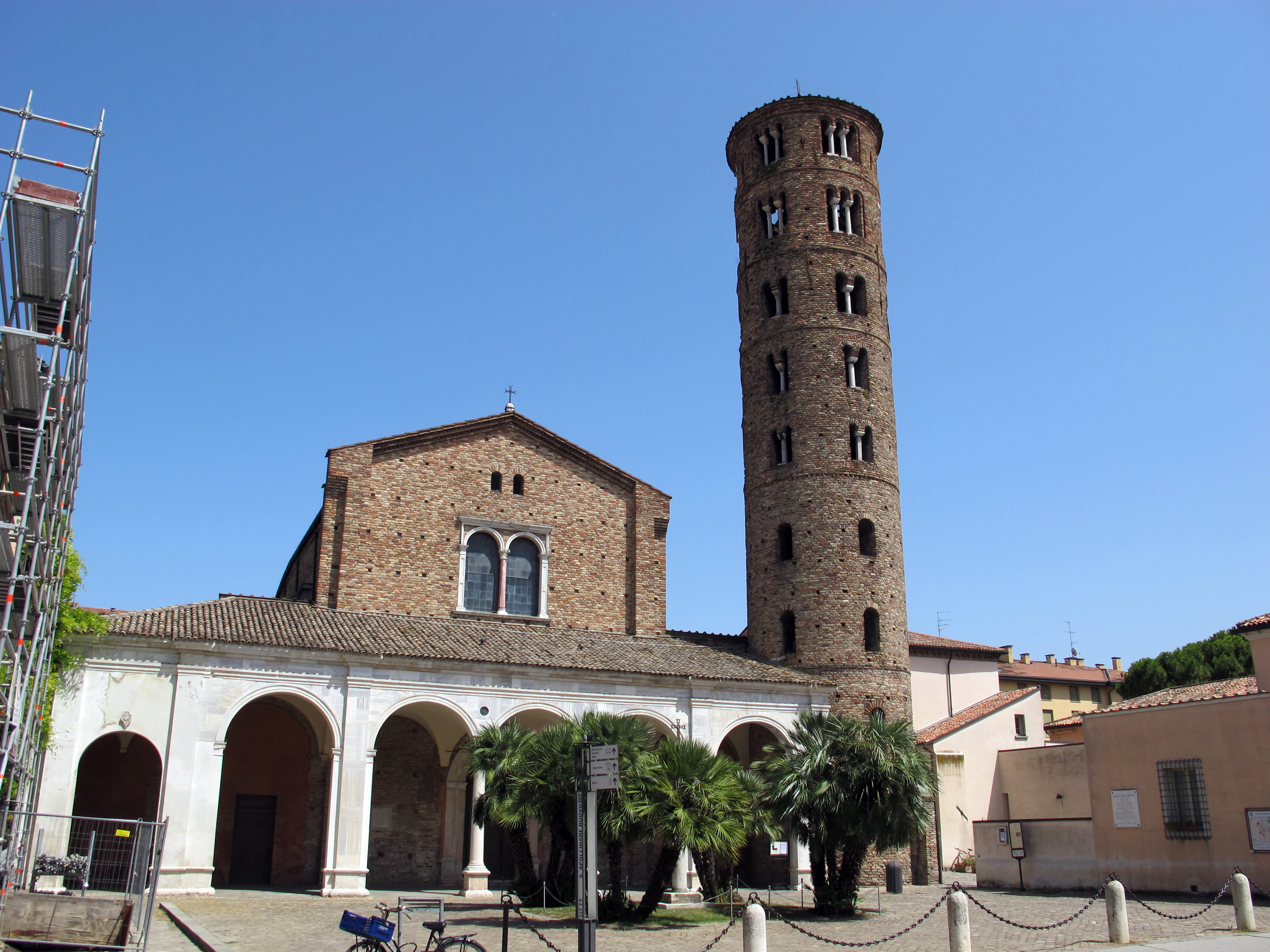

Religion
- Affiliation: Roman Catholic
- Province: Archdiocese of Ravenna-Cervia
- Rite: Roman
- Year consecrated: 6th century

Location
- Location: Ravenna, Italy
- Interactive map of New Basilica of Saint Apollinaris; Basilica di Sant'Apollinare Nuovo (in Italian)
- Coordinates: 44°25′00″N 12°12′17″E

Architecture
- Style: Early Christian, Byzantine
- Groundbreaking: 505
- UNESCO World Heritage Site
- Official name: Early Christian Monuments of Ravenna
- Type: Cultural
- Criteria: i, ii, iii, iv
- Designated: 1996 (20th session)
- Reference no.: 788
- State Party: Italy
- Region: Europe and North America

The Basilica of Sant'Apollinare Nuovo is a basilica church in Ravenna, Italy. It was erected by the Ostrogothic king Theodoric the Great as his palace chapel during the first quarter of the 6th century (as attested to in the Liber Pontificalis). This Arian church was originally dedicated in 504 AD to "Christ the Redeemer". Its present dedication dates only from the 9th century. The basilica's current façade, which features a portico, dates to the 16th century, while the adjacent tower dates to the 10th century.

It was reconsecrated in 561 AD, under the rule of the Byzantine emperor Justinian I, under the new name "Sanctus Martinus in Coelo Aureo" ("Saint Martin in Golden Heaven"). Suppressing the Arian church, Justinian rededicated the church to Saint Martin of Tours, a foe of Arianism. According to legend, Pope Gregory the Great ordered that the mosaics in the church be blackened, as their golden glory distracted worshipers from their prayers. The basilica was renamed again in 856 AD when relics of Saint Apollinaris were transferred from the Basilica of Sant'Apollinare in Classe because of the threat posed by frequent raids of pirates from the Adriatic Sea.

Its apse and atrium underwent modernization at various times, beginning in the 6th century with the destruction of mosaics whose themes were too overtly Arian or which expressed the king's glory, but the mosaics of the lateral walls, twenty-four columns with simplified Corinthian capitals, and an Ambo are preserved. On some columns, images of arms and hands can be seen, which are parts of figures once representing praying Goths and Theodoric's court, deleted in Byzantine times. Renovations (and alterations) were done to the mosaics in the mid-19th century by Felice Kibel. The present apse is a reconstruction after being damaged during World War II.

== Description ==
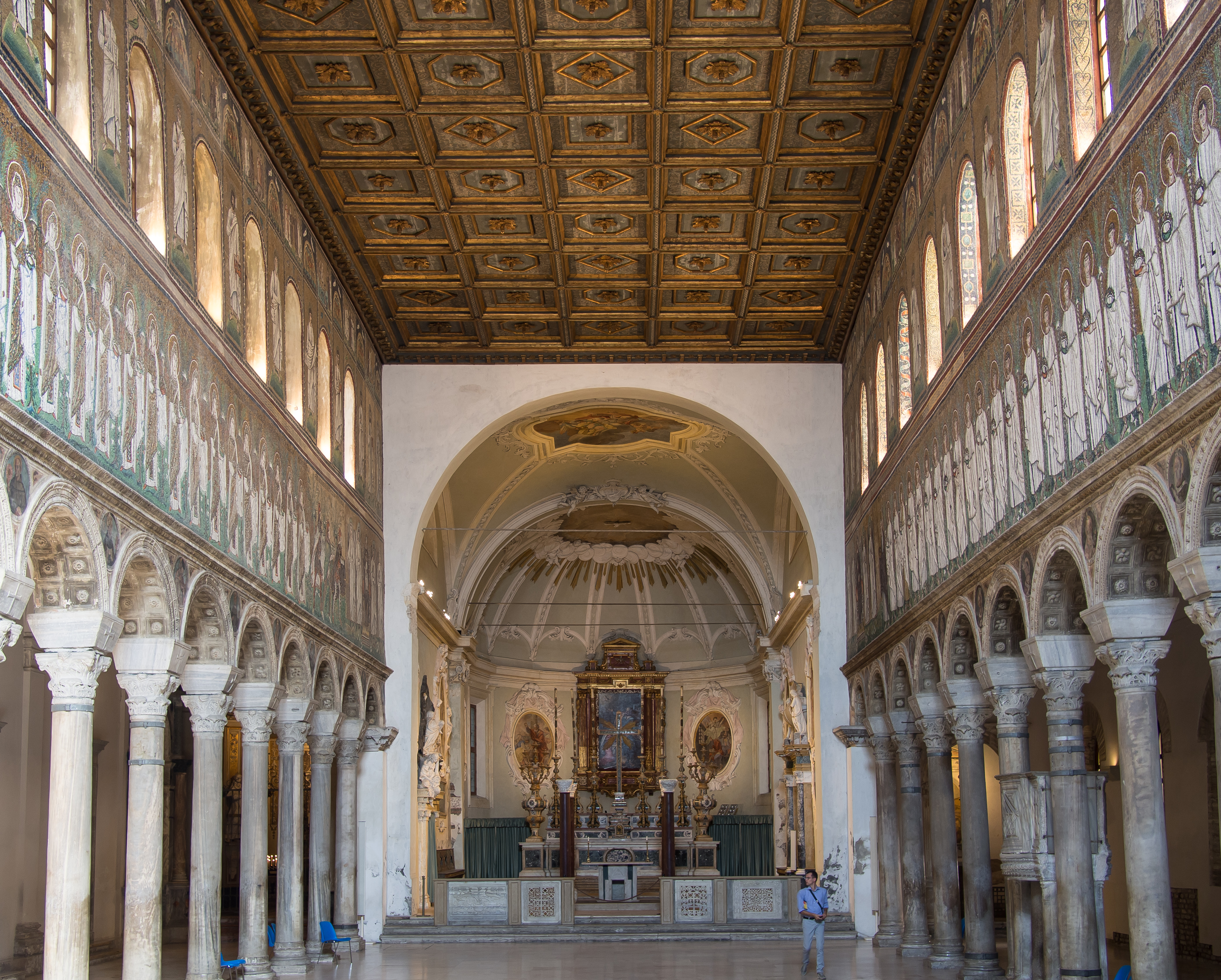
View towards the Apses

On the upper band of the left lateral wall are 13 small mosaics, depicting Jesus' miracles and parables; and on the right wall are 13 mosaics depicting the Passion and Resurrection. However, the flagellation and crucifixion are lacking. They describe the parts of the Bible that were read aloud in the church during Lent under the rule of Theodoric the Great. On the left, Jesus is always depicted as a young, beardless man, dressed as a Roman Emperor. On the right, Jesus is depicted with a beard. For the Arians, this emphasized that Jesus grew older and became a "man of sorrows", as spoken of by the prophet Isaiah. These mosaics are separated by decorative mosaic panels depicting a shell-shaped niche with a tapestry, cross, and two doves. These mosaics were executed by at least two artists.

The next row of mosaics are a scheme of haloed saints, prophets and evangelists, sixteen on each side. The figures are executed in a Hellenistic-Roman tradition and show a certain individuality of expression as compared to the other figures in the basilica. Each individual depicted holds a book, in either scroll or codex format, and, like many of the other figures throughout the basilica, each of their robes has a mark or symbol on it. These mosaics alternate with windows. They were executed in the time of Theodoric.

The row below contains large mosaics in Byzantine style, lacking any individuality, having all identical expressions. These were executed about 50 years after the time of Bishop Agnellus (d. 570), when the church had already become an orthodox church. To the left is a procession of 22 Virgins of the Byzantine period, led by the Three Magi, moving from the city of Classe towards the Madonna and Child who are surrounded by four angels. (The Magi in this mosaic are named Balthasar, Melchior and Gaspar; this is thought to be the earliest example of these three names being assigned to the Magi in Christian art.) To the right is a similar procession of 26 Martyrs, led by Saint Martin and including Saint Apollinaris, moving from the Palace of Theodoric towards a depiction of Christ enthroned amid four angels. This lower band, containing a schematic representation of the Palace of Theodoric on the right wall and the port of Classe with three ships on the left wall, gives us a certain idea of the architecture in Ravenna during the time of Theodoric. In another part of the church there is a rough mosaic containing the portrait of the Emperor Justinian as an old man, though it may have originally depicted Theodoric.

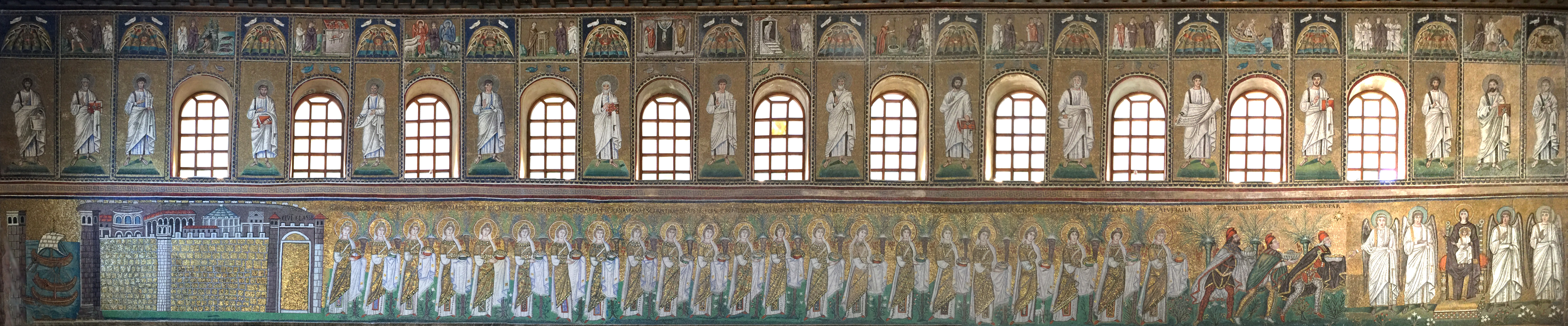
Panorama of the left lateral wall mosaics
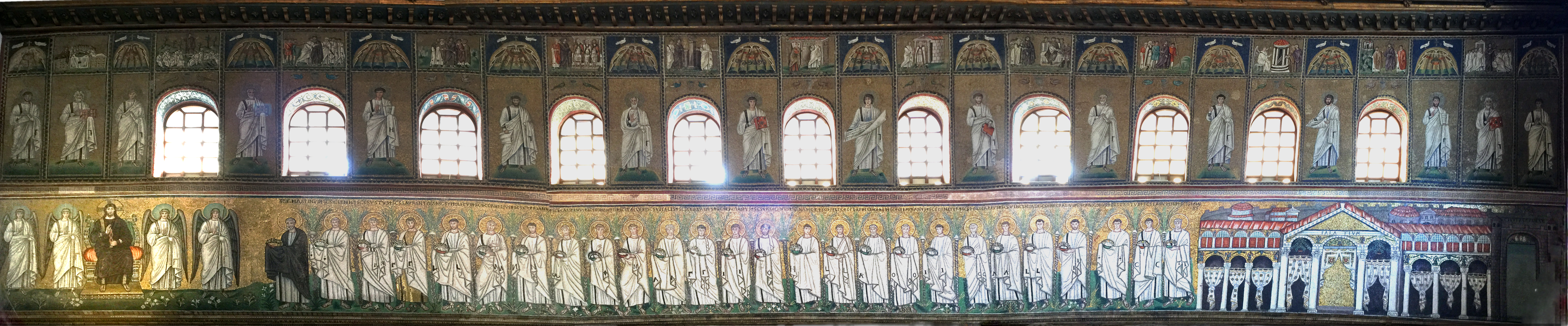
Panorama of the right lateral wall mosaics

The entrance of the church is preceded by a marble portico built in the 16th century. The portico against the facade and the mullioned window in the center were rebuilt after a World War I bombing. Next to the church, on the right side of the portico, stands a round bell tower dating from the 9th or 10th century.

When the UNESCO inscribed the church on the World Heritage List, its experts pointed out that "both the exterior and interior of the basilica graphically illustrate the fusion between the western and eastern styles characteristic of the late 5th to early 6th century. This is one of the most important buildings from the period of crucial cultural significance in European religious art". (See: Church architecture.)

Some art historians claim that one of the mosaics contains the first depiction of Satan in western art. In the mosaic, a blue angel appears to the left hand side of Jesus behind three goats (mentioned in St Matthew's account of Judgement Day).

== Gallery ==
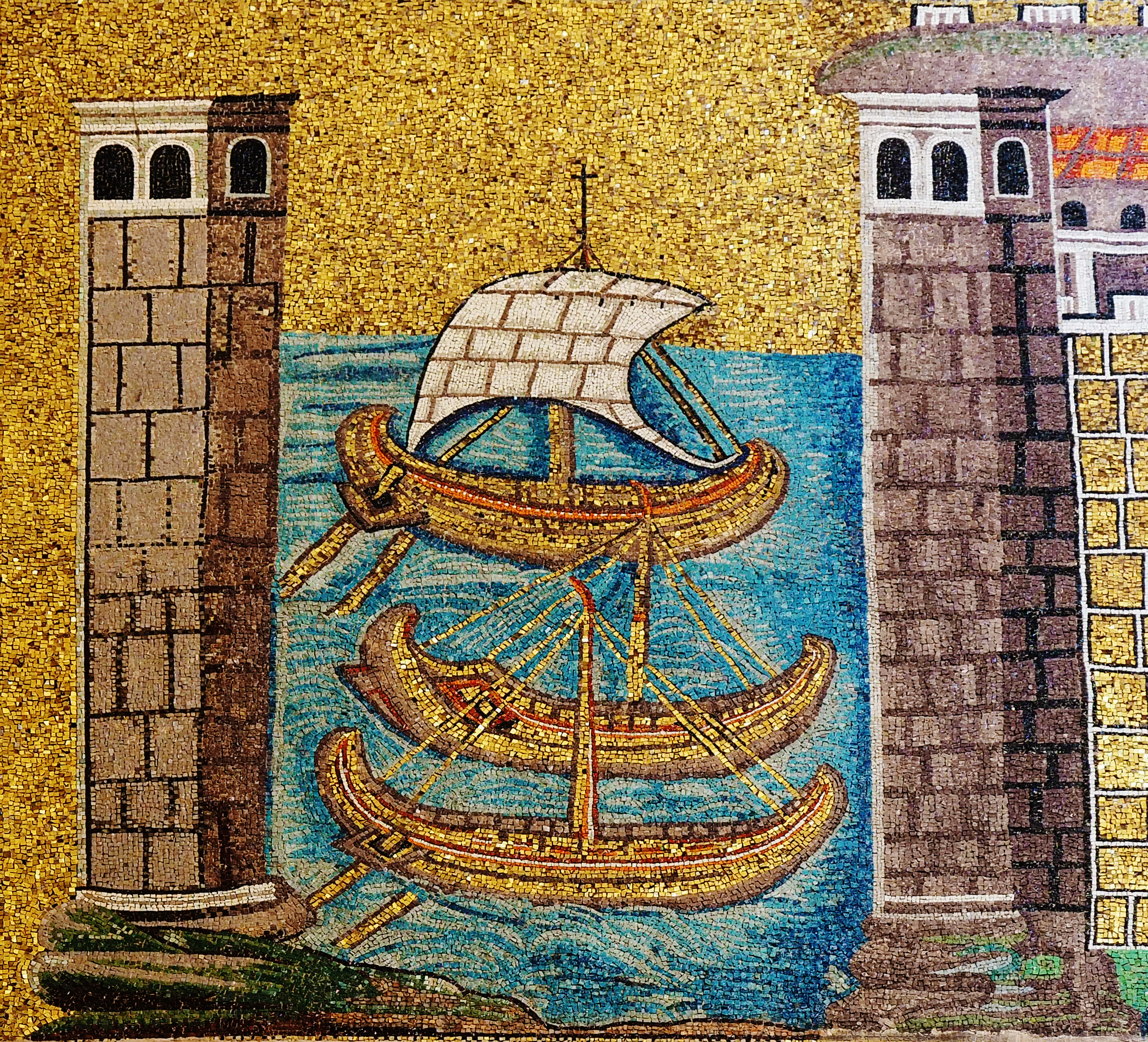
Mosaic of Classe, ancient port of Ravenna

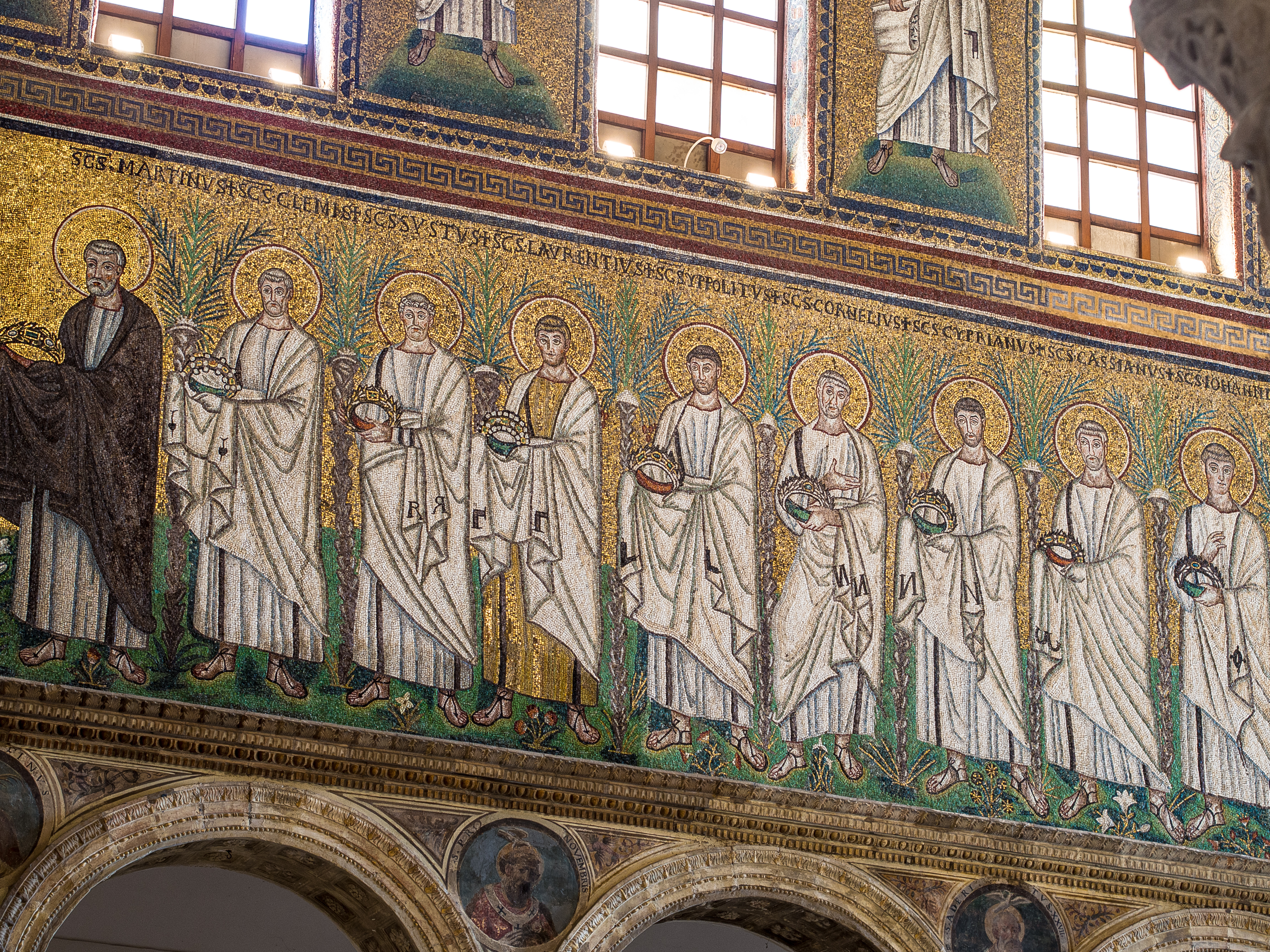
The nave as seen from an aisle, featuring a mosaic of several saints

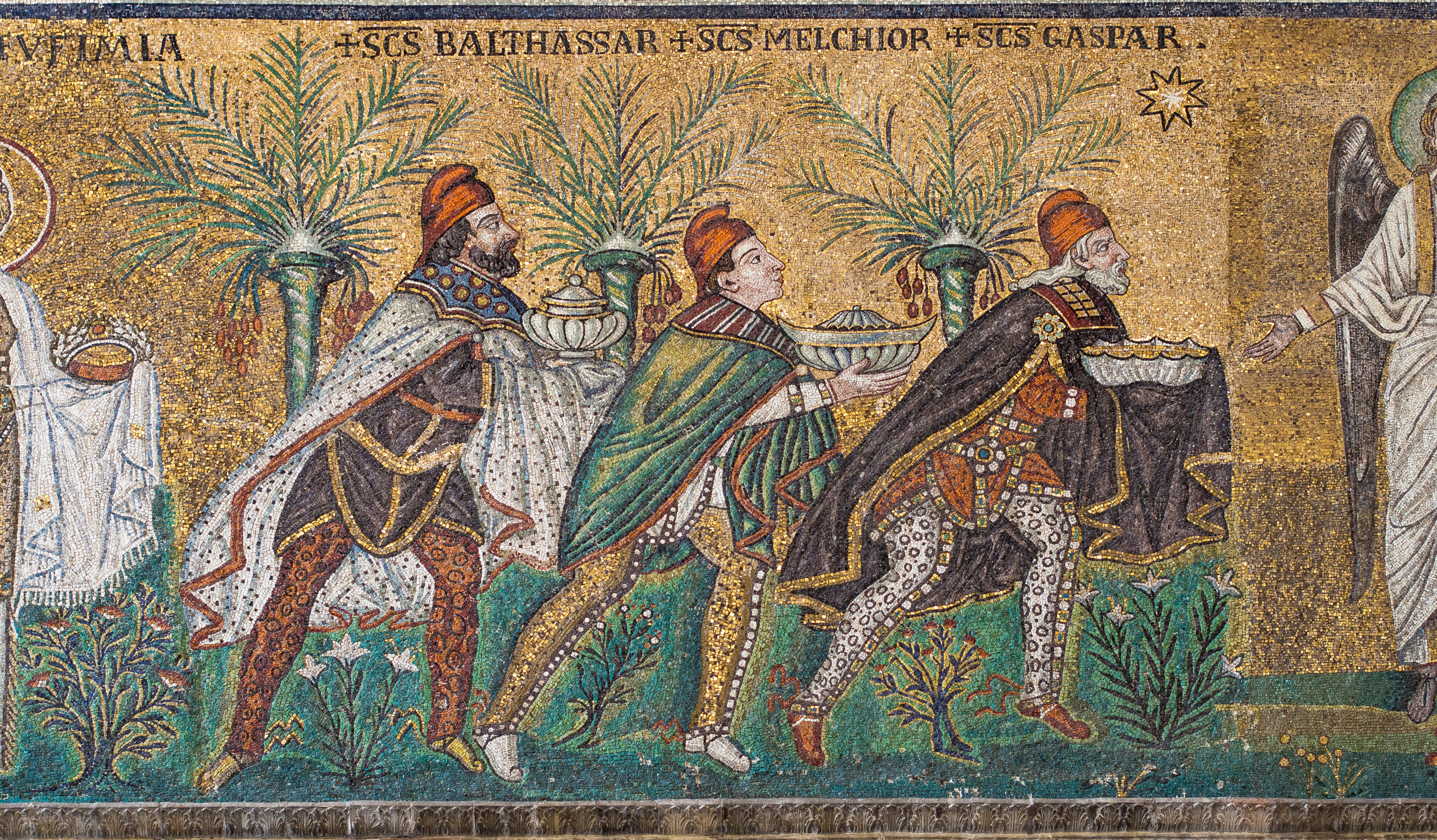
Three Wise Men wearing trousers and Phrygian caps as a sign of their Oriental origin

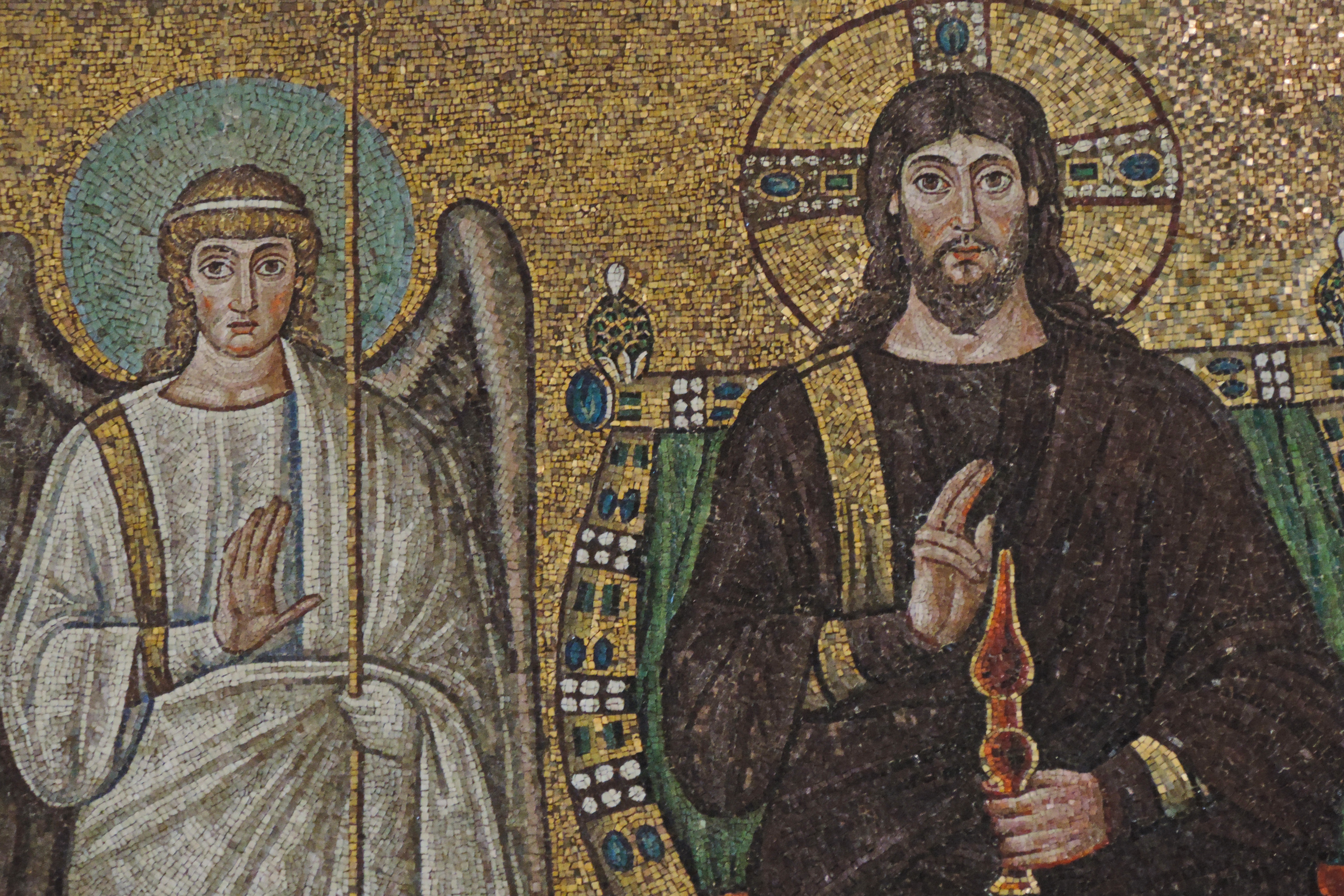
The enthroned Christ with four vanguard angels

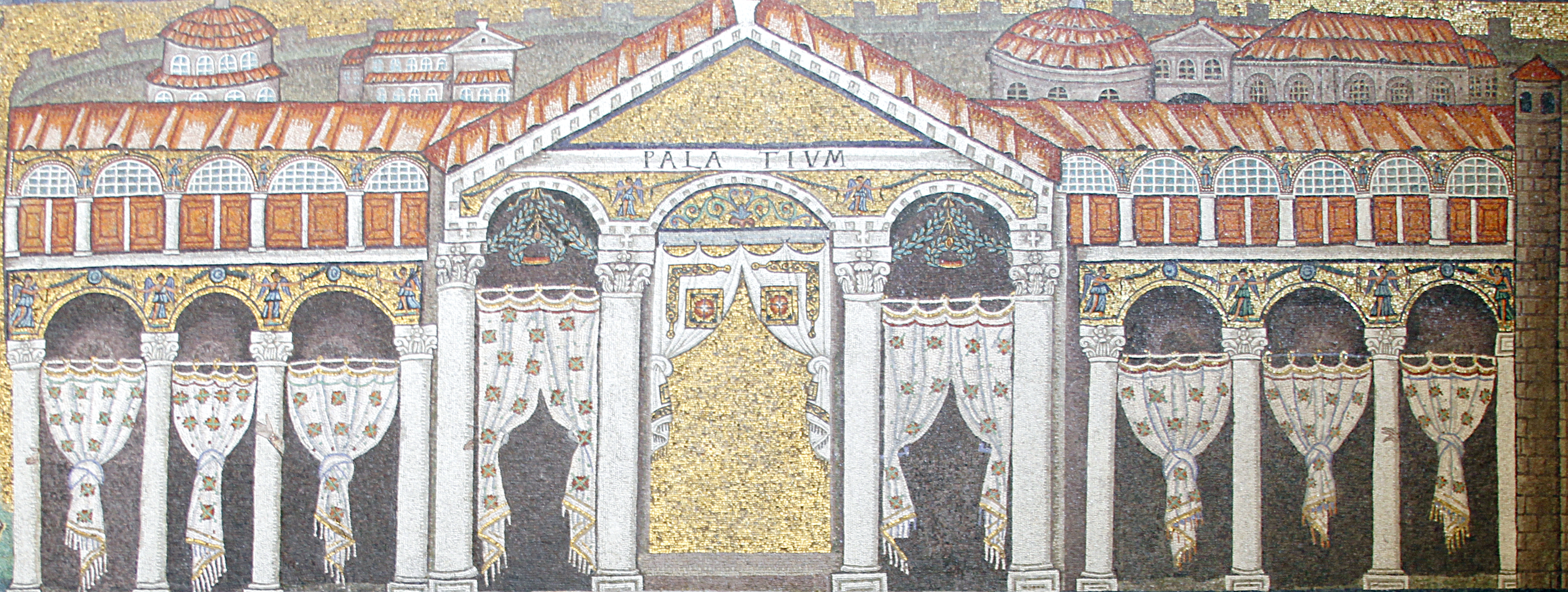
Mosaic of Palace of Theoderic. After his death, images that depicted him and other people were removed from the mosaic and covered with other images. Of the original figures, the hands still remain on the columns of the palace.

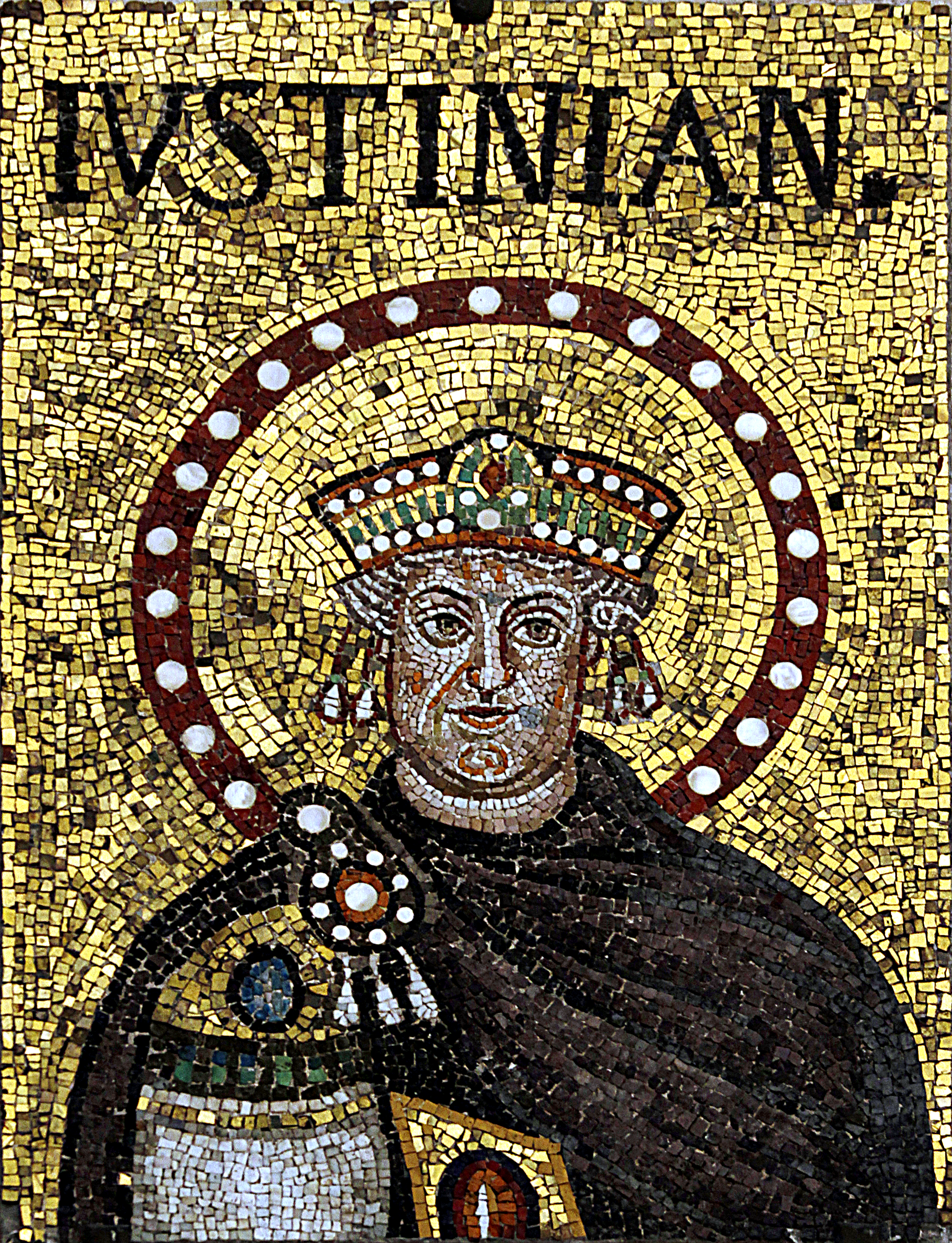
Mosaic of Justinian, possibly a modified portrait of Theoderic

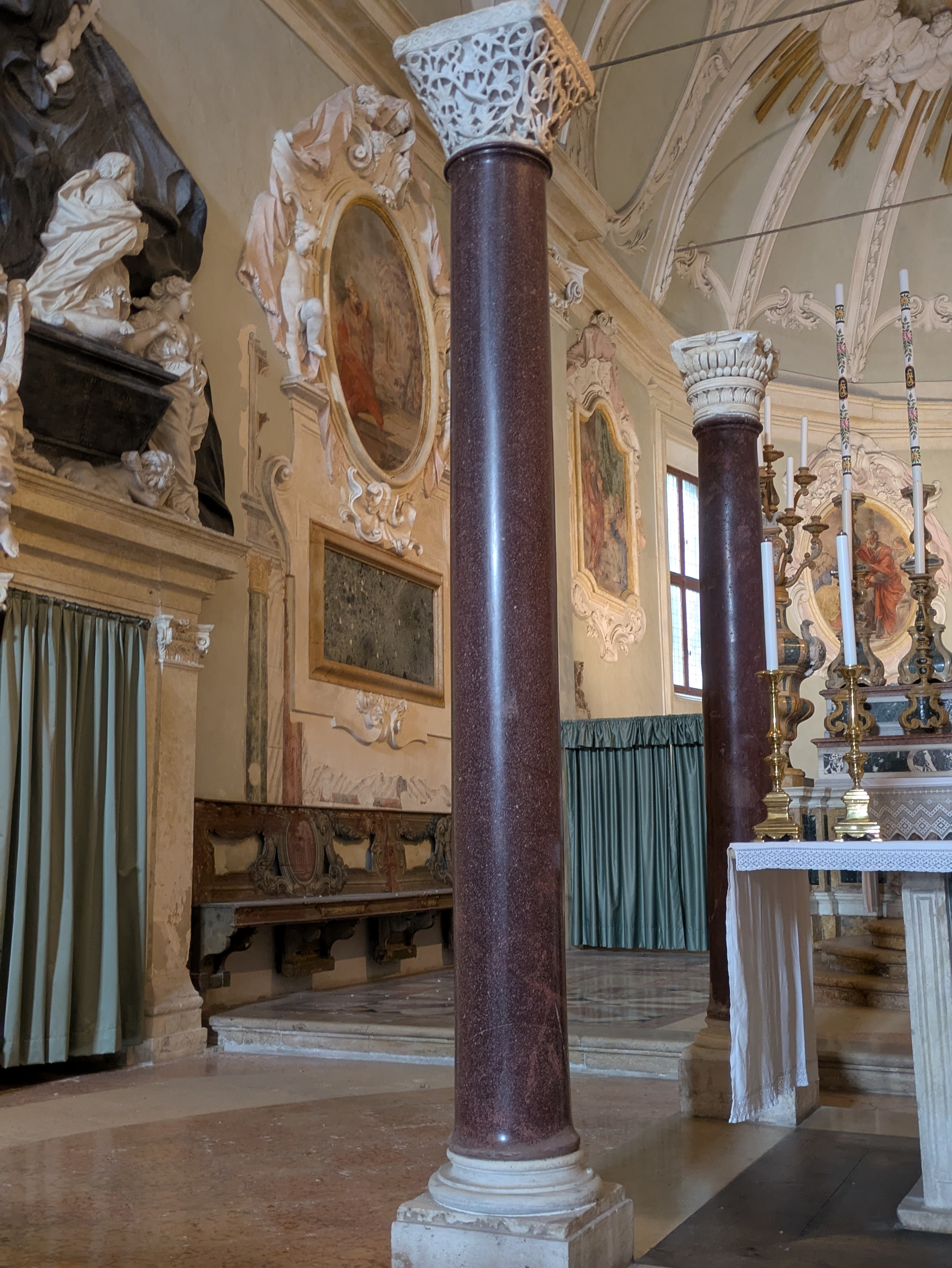
Porphyry columns in the altar area
