= Life of Saint Apolinaria =

The Life of Saint Apolinaria (Greek: Βίος τῆς μακαρίας Ἀποληναρίας, romanized: Bios tes makarias Apolenarias) is a legendary Greek saint's life. It is about Apolinaria, a transvestite virgin girl living as a monk in the desert of Scetis in Egypt. It is the Greek counterpart to the Coptic Legend of Hilaria.

Apolinaria's feast day, according to the Acta Sanctorum, is January 1.

== Synopsis ==
Apolinaria was a daughter of Anthemius, called "emperor" in the Life, but actually only praetorian prefect in the early 5th century. She had a sister who was "possessed" by "an unclean spirit". She refused to accept an arranged marriage. Relenting to her demands, her parents hired nuns "to teach her the Psalms and how to read". Eventually, they gave her an escort and sent her with much wealth to visit the Holy Places.

Apolinaria first sailed to Ashkelon, where she visited churches and dispensed alms. She dismissed some of her escort and went on with the rest to the Jordan and Jerusalem, dispensing alms along the way. She dismissed more of her servants and returned to Ashkelon, where she took ship to Alexandria to visit the shrine of Saint Menas. In Alexandria, she secretly purchased a monastic habit and dismissed the rest of her escort, taking as her companions only an old man and a eunuch.

In Alexandria, she hired a covered litter to take her to pay her respects to the monks of Scetis. When it stopped at a place that later came to be called the Spring of Apolinaria, she pulled aside the curtain and found the men asleep. She changed into her monk's clothes and went into the marsh, where she lived off dates. The eunuch and litter-bearer awoke to find only her clothes. Her disappearance was relayed to the emperor, whereupon even the Senate wept.

Apolinaria lived in the marsh for several years "contending with the devil". Her skin became "like the shell of a tortoise and she became food for the gnats". In a vision, Christ told her to leave the marsh and take the masculine name Dorotheos. On the road she met Makarios, who took her for a eunuch and gave her a cell in his monastic community, where she practised basket weaving. Although she resisted the devil's nightly temptations, a demon took possession of her sister as a means of getting to her.

The emperor sent his possessed daughter to Scetis to be cured. Makarios entrusted her to Dorotheos, who exorcised the demon. Back in Constantinople, the devil causes the sister to appear pregnant and to believe that she was impregnated by the monk who exorcised her demon. The emperor sent men to destroy the monastery, but they merely took Dorotheos back to Constantinople. In a private audience with the emperor and empress, she proved that she was a woman by exposing her breasts and revealed her true identity. She then healed her sister's false pregnancy.

Apolinaria remained in Constantinople some days before returning to Scetis. Only a few days after her return, as she lay dying, she asked Makarios not to let the monks prepare her body for burial. Nonetheless, they washed her body anyway and discovered that she was a woman. Her name and her life were subsequently revealed to Makarios in a vision. She was buried in the cave of Makarios.

== Textual history ==
The Life of Saint Apolinaria is one of several fictional saint's lives that "may have been mass-produced by a school of Egyptian scribes at a time when the desert of Scetis had become the acknowledged center of the monastic movement." Besides Apolinaria and Hilaria, other transvestite female saints reportedly living in Scetis in the 5th or 6th centuries include Anastasia, Athanasia, Euphrosyne, Matrona of Perge and Theodora. Their lives may be said to form a literary cycle.

The earliest copies of the Greek text are in the manuscript Cod. Vat. Gr. 819 of the Vatican Library, which dates to the 11th or 12th century, and in an 11th-century manuscript on Lesbos. A 15th-century copy is found in Cod. Barocc. 148 of the Bodleian Library. In the 17th century, the Bollandists made a copy of Cod. Vat. Gr. 819, now manuscript 8229 in the Royal Library of Belgium. A Latin translation made from Cod. Vat. Gr. 819 was published by Luigi Lippomano (1550s) and Laurentius Surius (1570s). It was included in the Patrologia Graeca because the Greek text could not be found. The Latin text uses the name Apollinaris throughout. The Greek text was first published by James Drescher, but with the last part of the text missing. Anthony Alcock has translated it into English.

== Bibliography ==
- Anson, John (1974). "The Female Transvestite in Early Monasticism: The Origin and Development of a Motif". Viator. 5: 1–32. doi:10.1484/j.viator.2.301617.
- Alcock, Anthony (n.d.). "The Life of St Apolinaria". Academia.edu.
- Drescher, James, ed. (1947). Three Coptic Legends: Hilaria, Archellites, the Seven Sleepers (PDF). Cairo: Imprimerie de l'Institut Francais d'Archéologie Orientale. Archived from the original (PDF) on 2011-11-15.
