= Rio Covo (Santa Eugénia) =

- Civil parish
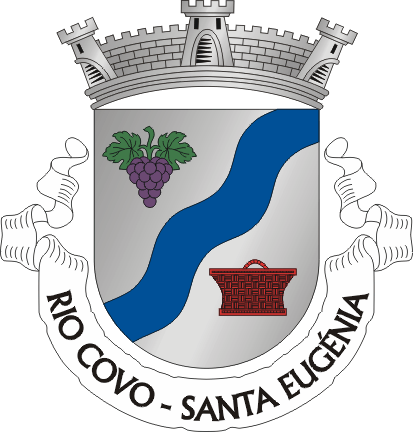
- Coat of arms

- Location in Portugal
- Coordinates: 41.528°N 8.595°W
- Country: Portugal
- Region: Norte
- Intermunic. comm.: Cávado
- District: Braga
- Municipality: Barcelos

Area
  - Total: 3.13 km^{2} (1.21 sq mi)

Population (2011)
  - Total: 1,483
  - Density: 474/km^{2} (1,230/sq mi)
- Time zone: UTC+00:00 (WET)
  - Summer (DST): UTC+01:00 (WEST)

Rio Covo (Santa Eugénia) is a Portuguese freguesia ("civil parish"), located in the municipality of Barcelos. The population in 2011 was 1,483, in an area of 3.13 km^{2}.

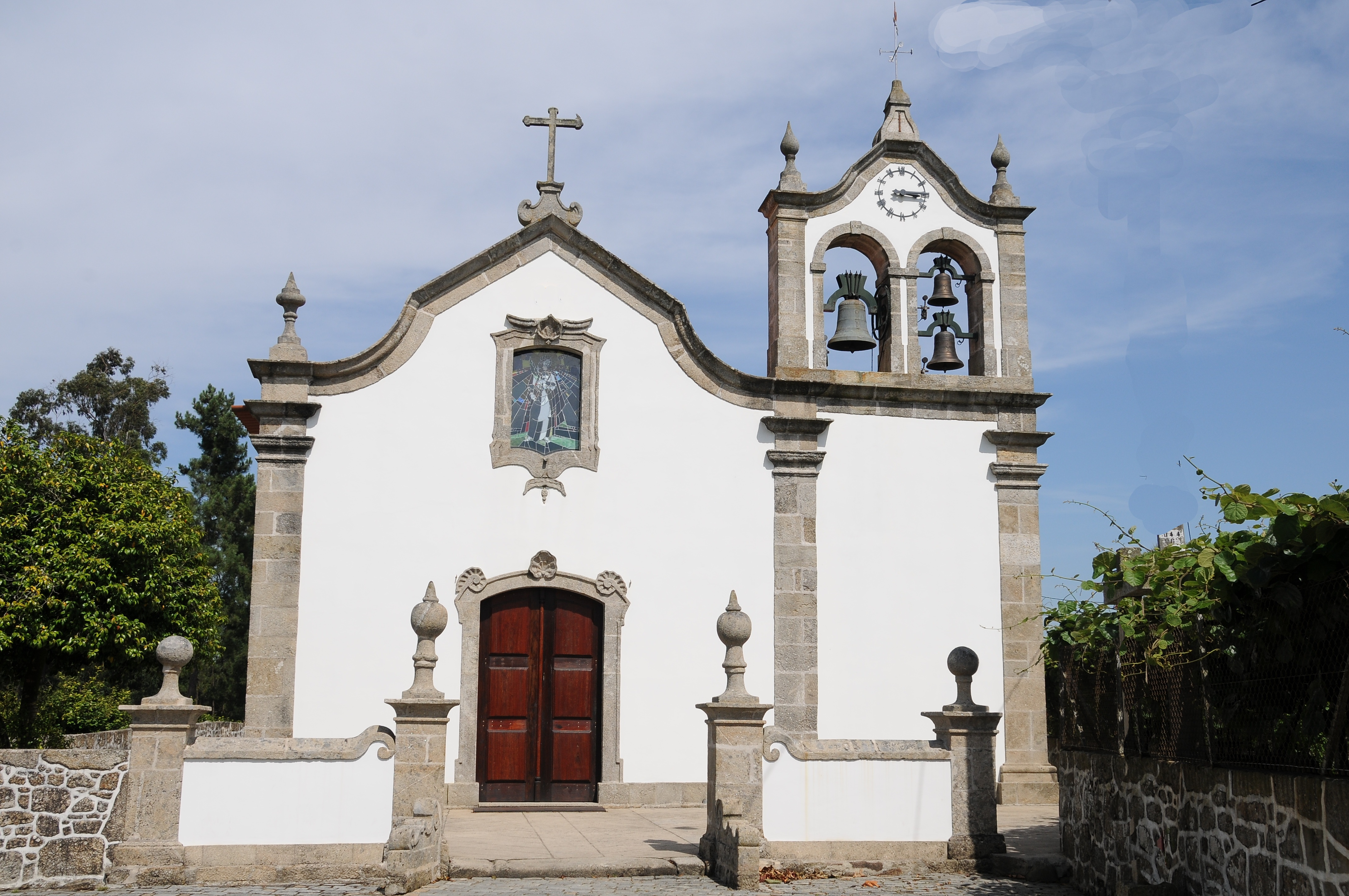
Rio Covo Church
