= 1843 =

1843 in various calendars
- Gregorian calendar: 1843; MDCCCXLIII
- Ab urbe condita: 2596
- Armenian calendar: 1292; ԹՎ ՌՄՂԲ
- Assyrian calendar: 6593
- Balinese saka calendar: 1764–1765
- Bengali calendar: 1249–1250
- Berber calendar: 2793
- British Regnal year: 6 Vict. 1 – 7 Vict. 1
- Buddhist calendar: 2387
- Burmese calendar: 1205
- Byzantine calendar: 7351–7352
- Chinese calendar: 壬寅年 (Water Tiger); 4540 or 4333 — to — 癸卯年 (Water Rabbit); 4541 or 4334
- Coptic calendar: 1559–1560
- Discordian calendar: 3009
- Ethiopian calendar: 1835–1836
- Hebrew calendar: 5603–5604
- Hindu calendars
- Vikram Samvat: 1899–1900
- Shaka Samvat: 1764–1765
- Kali Yuga: 4943–4944
- Holocene calendar: 11843
- Igbo calendar: 843–844
- Iranian calendar: 1221–1222
- Islamic calendar: 1258–1259
- Japanese calendar: Tenpō 14 (天保１４年)
- Javanese calendar: 1770–1771
- Julian calendar: Gregorian minus 12 days
- Korean calendar: 4176
- Minguo calendar: 69 before ROC 民前69年
- Nanakshahi calendar: 375
- Thai solar calendar: 2385–2386
- Tibetan calendar: ཆུ་ཕོ་སྟག་ལོ་ (male Water-Tiger); 1969 or 1588 or 816 — to — ཆུ་མོ་ཡོས་ལོ་ (female Water-Hare); 1970 or 1589 or 817

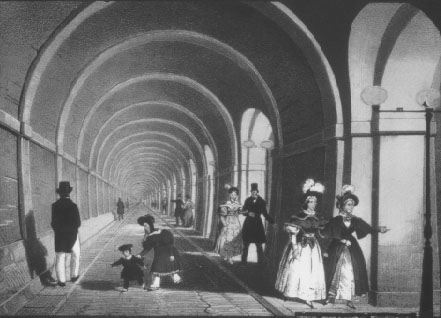
March 25: The Thames Tunnel, a pedestrian crossing underneath the River Thames in London, is opened to the public.

1843 (MDCCCXLIII) was a common year starting on Sunday of the Gregorian calendar and a common year starting on Friday of the Julian calendar, the 1843rd year of the Common Era (CE) and Anno Domini (AD) designations, the 843rd year of the 2nd millennium, the 43rd year of the 19th century, and the 4th year of the 1840s decade. As of the start of 1843, the Gregorian calendar was 12 days ahead of the Julian calendar, which remained in localized use until 1923.

== Events ==
=== January–March ===
- January 3 – The Illustrated Treatise on the Maritime Kingdoms (海國圖志, Hǎiguó Túzhì) compiled by Wei Yuan and others, the first significant Chinese work on the West, is published in China.
- January 6 – Antarctic explorer James Clark Ross discovers Snow Hill Island.
- January 20 – Honório Hermeto Carneiro Leão, Marquis of Paraná is appointed by the Emperor, Dom Pedro, as the leader of the Brazilian Council of Ministers, although the office of Prime Minister of Brazil will not be officially created until 1847.
- January
  - Serial publication of Charles Dickens's novel Martin Chuzzlewit begins in London; in the July chapters, he lands his hero in the United States.
  - Edgar Allan Poe's short story "The Tell-Tale Heart" is published in The Pioneer, a Boston magazine.
  - The Quaker magazine The Friend is first published in London.
- February 3 – Uruguayan Civil War: Argentina supports Oribe of Uruguay, and begins a siege of Montevideo.
- February 6 – The Virginia Minstrels perform the first minstrel show, at the Bowery Amphitheatre in New York City.
- February 8 – The 1843 Guadeloupe Earthquake hits the Caribbean island of Guadeloupe, killing 1,500–5,000 people.
- February 11 – Giuseppe Verdi's opera I Lombardi alla prima crociata premieres at La Scala in Milan.
- February 14 – The event that will inspire The Beatles' 1967 song "Being for the Benefit of Mr. Kite!" is held in England.
- February 25 – Paulet Affair: Lord George Paulet occupies the Kingdom of Hawaii in the name of Great Britain.
- February – Shaikh Ali bin Khalifa Al-Khalifa captures the fort and town of Riffa after the rival branch of the family fails to gain control of the Riffa Fort and flees to Manama. Shaikh Mohamed bin Ahmed is killed at the battle, called the Battle of Hunayniya.
- March 8 – The Danish government re-establishes the Althing in Iceland as an advisory body, by royal decree.
- March 11–14 – Eta Carinae flares, to become the second-brightest star.
- March 13 – Catawba County, North Carolina is created, and its first court is held in Mathias Barringer Jr.'s house.
- March 15 – Victoria, British Columbia, is founded by the Hudson's Bay Company as a trading post and fort.
- March 16 – The city of Petrópolis is founded by the government of Brazil.
- March 21 – The world does not end, contrary to the first prediction by American preacher William Miller.
- March 24 – Battle of Hyderabad: The Bombay Army, led by Major General Sir Charles Napier, defeats the Talpur Mirs, securing Sindh as a province of British India.
- March 25 – Marc Isambard Brunel's Thames Tunnel, the first tunnel under the River Thames and the world's first bored underwater tunnel, is opened in London for pedestrians.

=== April–June ===
- April 7 – The Indian Slavery Act, 1843 removes legal support for slavery within the territories of the East India Company
- April 16 or 17 – A group of 24 West Indian Moravians from Jamaica and Antigua, recruited by the Danish minister and Basel missionary, Andreas Riis, arrive in Christiansborg (Osu), Gold Coast, now Ghana, to set up schools and Presbyterian churches in the country.
- May 4 – Natal is proclaimed a British colony.
- May 18 – In Edinburgh, the Free Church of Scotland is disrupted from the Church of Scotland.
- May 22 – The first major wagon train headed for the American Northwest sets out with 1,000 pioneers from Elm Grove, Missouri, on the Oregon Trail.
- May 23 – Chile takes possession of the Strait of Magellan.
- June 6 – In Barbados, Samuel Jackman Prescod is the first non-white person elected to the House of Assembly.
- June 17 – In New Zealand, a posse of British settlers sent to arrest Māori chief Te Rauparaha clash with members of his Ngāti Toa tribe, resulting in 26 deaths.
- June 21 – Edgar Allan Poe's short story "The Gold-Bug" begins serialization in American newspapers.

=== July–September ===
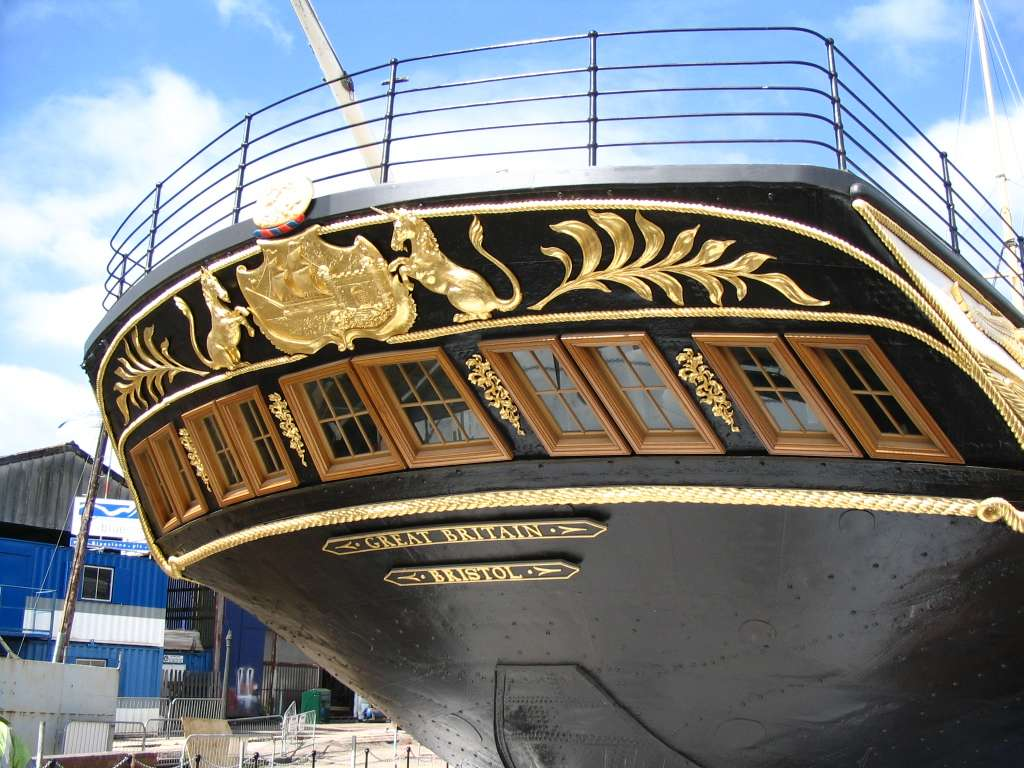
July 19: SS Great Britain launch

- July – Margaret Fuller's "The Great Lawsuit. Man versus Men. Woman versus Women" appears in The Dial magazine in the United States.
- July 19 – Isambard Kingdom Brunel's SS Great Britain is launched from Bristol; it will be the first iron-hulled, propeller-driven ship to cross the Atlantic Ocean.
- July 25 – Père Antoine Désiré Mégret, a Capuchin missionary, purchases the land that will become Abbeville, Louisiana for $900, a town founded by descendants of Acadians from Nova Scotia.
- August 1 – Brazil becomes the second country, after Great Britain, to issue nationally valid postage stamps, with the release of its Bull's Eye series.
- August 19 – Edgar Allan Poe's short story "The Black Cat" is first published in The Saturday Evening Post.

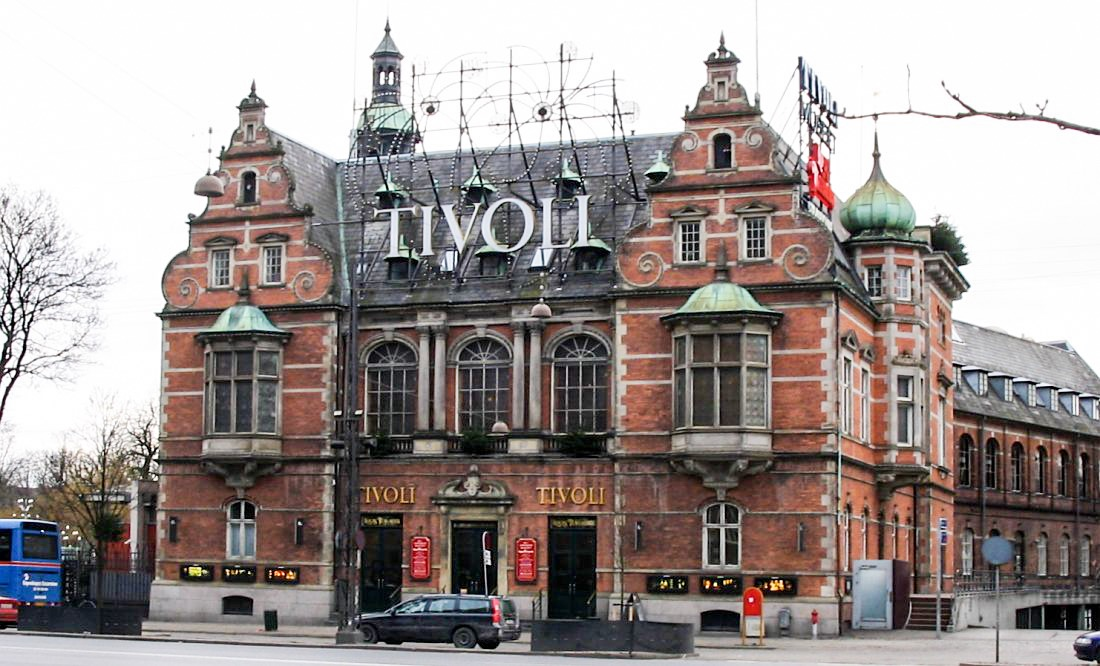
August 15: The Tivoli Gardens open in Denmark.

- August 15 – Tivoli Gardens, one of the oldest amusement parks in the world still intact, opens in Copenhagen, Denmark.
- September – Ada Lovelace translates and expands Menabrea's notes on Charles Babbage's Analytical Engine, including an algorithm for calculating a sequence of Bernoulli numbers, regarded as the world's first computer program.
- September 2 – The Economist newspaper is first published in London (preliminary issue dated August).
- September 4 – Emperor Dom Pedro II of Brazil marries Dona Teresa Cristina of the Two Sicilies, in a state ceremony in Rio de Janeiro Cathedral.
- September 15 (Sept. 3, O.S.) – A Popular uprising in Athens, Greece, including citizens and military captains, demands from King Otto a liberal Constitution from the state, which has been governed since independence (1830) by various domestic and foreign business interests.
- September 21 – The crew of schooner Ancud, including John Williams Wilson, takes possession of the Strait of Magellan on behalf of the Chilean government.

=== October–December ===
- October 3 – Elling Eielsen is ordained as the first Norwegian Lutheran minister in the United States.
- October 16
  - Søren Kierkegaard's philosophical book Fear and Trembling is first published, in Denmark.
  - Irish mathematician William Rowan Hamilton discovers the calculus of quaternions and deduces that they are non-commutative.
- October 30 – Fuerte Bulnes, the first Chilean settlement in the strait of Magellan, is founded.
- November 17 – The city of Shanghai opens for trade with foreigners for the first time, welcoming a party of traders from the United Kingdom.
- November 25 – Mount Etna erupts in Italy, and kills 69 people in the village of Bronte.
- November 28 – Hawaii is recognized as an independent nation by the United Kingdom and France. The holiday is celebrated annually as La Ku'oko'a (Independence Day).
- December 9 – Bishop's University is founded as Bishop's College by Bishop George Jehoshaphat Mountain in Lennoxville, Quebec, for the education of members of the Church of England.
- December 13 – Basutoland becomes a British protectorate.
- December 19 – Charles Dickens's novella A Christmas Carol is first published in London, England. Released on December 19, it sells out by Christmas Eve.
- December 21 – The first total solar eclipse of Saros 139 occurs over southern Asia.
- December – The world's first Christmas cards, commissioned by Sir Henry Cole in London from the artist John Callcott Horsley, are sent.

=== Date unknown ===
- In Asia, the House of Jamalullail is established in the state of Perlis Darul Sunnah (formally as Perlis Indera Kayangan) after separation from the state of Kedah.
- James Joule experimentally finds the mechanical equivalent of heat.
- The steam powered rotary printing press is invented, by Richard March Hoe in the United States.
- Saint Louis University School of Law becomes the first law school west of the Mississippi River.
- Kurdish leader Bedir Khan Beg launched an expedition against the Assyrians in the Hakkari region.Thousands of Assyrians were massacred during the campaign.

== Births ==
=== January ===
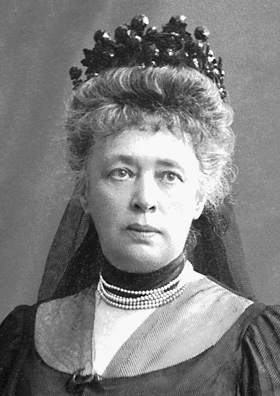
Bertha von Suttner

- January 1 – Nikolai Lodyzhensky, Russian composer (d. 1916)
- January 3 – Elzéar Abeille de Perrin, French entomologist (d. 1910)
- January 5 – Victor Brooke, Anglo-Irish naturalist and baronet (d. 1891)
- January 8
  - Frederick Abberline, Chief Inspector of the London Metropolitan Police, investigator in the Jack the Ripper murders (d. 1929)
  - John H. Moffitt, American politician (d. 1926)
  - Karl Eduard Heusner, Vice-Admiral of the German Imperial Navy (d. 1891)
- January 9 – Darius D. Hare, U.S. representative from Ohio (d. 1897)
- January 10
  - Frank James, American outlaw (d. 1915)
  - Carroll S. Page, American lawyer, businessman and politician (d. 1925)
- January 11 – Adolf Eberle, German painter (d. 1914)
- January 13 – David Ferrier, Scottish neurologist (d. 1928)
- January 17 – Anton Thraen, German astronomer (d. 1902)
- January 18 – Fernand Pelez, French painter (d. 1913)
- January 20 – Paul Cambon, French diplomat (d. 1924)
- January 21 – Émile Levassor, French engineer (d. 1897)
- January 22 – Friedrich Blass, German scholar (d. 1907)
- January 25 – Hermann Schwarz, German mathematician (d. 1921)
- January 26 – Erdmann Encke, German sculptor (d. 1896)
- January 28 – Mihkel Veske, Estonian poet (d. 1891)
- January 29
  - William McKinley, 25th President of the United States (d. 1901)
  - Henry Carrington Bolton, American chemist and bibliographer (d. 1903)

=== February ===
- February 1 – John Isaac Thornycroft, English shipbuilder (d. 1928)
- February 3 – William Cornelius Van Horne, American entrepreneur (d. 1915)
- February 9
  - William Taylor Thornton, governor of New Mexico (d. 1916)
  - Nathan Goff Jr., U.S. representative from West Virginia (d. 1920)
- February 10 – Philippe Alexandre Jules Künckel d'Herculais, French entomologist and zoologist (d. 1918)
- February 13 – Georg von Rosen, Swedish painter (d. 1923)
- February 14 – Louis Diémer, French pianist (d. 1919)
- February 16 – Henry M. Leland, American machinist, inventor, engineer and automotive entrepreneur (d. 1932)
- February 17 – Aaron Montgomery Ward, American department store founder (d. 1913)
- February 19 – Adelina Patti, Spanish opera singer (d. 1919)
- February 20 – Theodor Höijer, Finnish architect (d. 1910)
- February 22 – Rudolf Montecuccoli, Austro-Hungarian admiral (d. 1922)
- February 24 – Teófilo Braga, Portuguese writer, playwright and politician (d. 1924)
- February 25 – Karl Gussow, German painter (d. 1907)
- February 28 – Đorđe Simić, Serbian politician (d. 1921)

=== March ===
- March 2 – Princess Maria Clotilde of Savoy daughter of Victor Emmanuel II of Italy, (d. 1911)
- March 3
  - Aleksander Sochaczewski, Polish painter (d. 1923)
  - William Chandler Roberts-Austen, English metallurgist (d. 1902)
- March 4 – John Barr, Canadian physician and politician (d. 1909
- March 6 – Arthur Napoleão dos Santos, Portuguese composer (d. 1925)
- March 7
  - Joseph James Cheeseman, Liberian politician, 12th President of Liberia (d.1896)
  - Tsuboi Kōzō, Japanese admiral (d. 1898)
  - Edwin H. Conger, American lawyer, banker and diplomat (d. 1907)
- March 8 – Arthur Brown, U.S. senator from Utah (d. 1906)
- March 9 – Abraham Abraham, American businessman (d. 1911)
- March 10 – James D. Richardson, American politician (d. 1914)
- March 11 – Harald Høffding, Danish philosopher and theologian (d. 1931)
- March 12 – Ludwig Dahn, German actor (d. 1898)
- March 14 – Léon Dehon, French Roman Catholic priest, founder of Priests of the Sacred Heart (d. 1925)
- March 15 – Arichi Shinanojō, Japanese admiral (d. 1919)
- March 16 – Louis Gregh, French composer (d. 1915)
- March 17 – Henry Ware Lawton, American general (d. 1899)
- March 18 – Jules Vandenpeereboom, Belgian politician (d. 1917)
- March 22 – Hiram Y. Smith, American politician (d. 1894)
- March 23 – Joseph F. Johnston, American politician (d. 1913)
- March 24 – James A. Mount, 24th governor of Indiana (d. 1901)
- March 26 – Johann Sioly, Austrian composer (d. 1911)
- March 27 – George Frederick Leycester Marshall, English naturalist (d. 1934)
- March 28 – Hippolyte Berteaux, French painter (d. 1926)
- March 31 – Bernhard Förster, German teacher (d. 1889)

=== April ===
- April 1
  - Étienne Blanchard, Canadian politician (d. 1918)
  - Venancio Antonio Morin, Venezuelan military officer and politician (d. 1919).
- April 2 – Karl Koester, German pathologist (d. 1904)
- April 3 – Knut Ekwall, Swedish painter (d. 1912)
- April 4 – William Henry Jackson, American explorer and photographer (d. 1942)
- April 7
  - Ernest Munier-Chalmas, French geologist (d. 1903)
  - John Mount Batten, British soldier and landowner (d. 1916)
- April 8 – Asger Hamerik, Danish composer (d. 1923)
- April 9 – Samuel W. Pennypacker, American politician and 23rd governor of Pennsylvania (d. 1916)
- April 11 – Johannes Minckwitz, German chess player (d. 1901)
- April 13 – Thomas Pennington Lucas, Scottish-born Australian medical practitioner, naturalist, author, philosopher and utopianist (d. 1917)
- April 14 – Gustave Huberti, Flemish composer (d. 1910)
- April 15 – Henry James, American novelist (d. 1916)
- April 17 – Camillo Sitte, Austrian architect (d. 1903)
- April 18 – Josiah Wood, Canadian lawyer, entrepreneur, mayor, parliamentarian, and the 13th Lieutenant Governor of the province of New Brunswick (d. 1927)
- April 21 – Walther Flemming, German biologist (d. 1905)
- April 22 – George I. Alden, American mechanical engineer and academic innovator (d. 1926)
- April 25 – Princess Alice of the United Kingdom, third child of Queen Victoria (d. 1878)
- April 29 – Pedro Américo, Brazilian novelist, poet, scientist, art theorist, essayist, philosopher, politician and professor (d. 1905)
- April 30 – Edward Colborne Baber, English orientalist (d. 1890)

=== May ===
- May 2 – Karl Michael Ziehrer, Austrian composer (d. 1922)
- May 3 – William Lyne Wilson, American politician (d. 1900)
- May 4 – Eugène Revillout, French Egyptologist (d. 1913)
- May 5 – William George Beers, Canadian dentist (d. 1900)
- May 6 – Grove Karl Gilbert, American geologist (d. 1918)
- May 7 – Léon Melchissédec, French baritone (d. 1925)
- May 8 – Rudolf Mosse, German publisher (d. 1920)
- May 9 – Anton von Werner, German painter (d. 1915)
- May 10 – Benito Pérez Galdós, Spanish novelist (d. 1920)
- May 13 – Paul de Smet de Naeyer, Belgian politician (d. 1913)
- May 15 – Georges Hartmann, French music publisher and dramatist (d. 1900)
- May 16 – Charles Wynn-Carington, 1st Marquess of Lincolnshire, English politician (d. 1928)
- May 19 – Axel Gudbrand Blytt, Norwegian botanist and geologist (d. 1898)
- May 20 – Itō Sukeyuki, Japanese admiral (d. 1914)
- May 21
  - Charles Albert Gobat, Swiss politician, recipient of the Nobel Peace Prize (d. 1914)
  - Louis Renault, French jurist, educator, and Nobel Prize laureate (d. 1918)
- May 22 – Adolf Aron Baginsky, German professor of diseases (d. 1918)
- May 23 – Yevgeni Ivanovich Alekseyev, Russian admiral and politician (d. 1917)
- May 25 – Paul Scheffer-Boichorst, German historian (d. 1902)
- May 27 – Prince Paul of Thurn and Taxis, son of Maximilian Karl, 6th Prince of Thurn and Taxis (d. 1879)
- May 28 – Joyce Emmerson Preston Muddock, British journalist (d. 1934)
- May 29
  - Émile Pessard, French composer (d. 1917)
  - Patrick Craigie, British agricultural statistician (d. 1930)
- May 30 – Louis Boehmer, German-American agronomist (d. 1896)
- May 31 – Fredrikke Marie Qvam, Norwegian humanitarian leader, feminist and liberal politician (d. 1938)

=== June ===
- June 1
  - Henry Faulds, Scottish physician, missionary and fingerprinting pioneer (d. 1930)
  - Saigō Jūdō, Japanese general, admiral, and politician (d. 1902)
- June 3 – King Frederick VIII of Denmark (d. 1912)
- June 4 – Charles Conrad Abbott, German archaeologist (d. 1919)
- June 5 – Samuel Garman, American zoologist (d. 1927)
- June 7 – Susan Blow, American educator (d. 1916)
- June 8 – Kálmán Széll, 13th Prime Minister of Hungary (d. 1915)
- June 9
  - Bertha von Suttner, Austrian writer and pacifist, recipient of the Nobel Peace Prize (d. 1914)
  - Wilhelm Dames, German paleontologist (d. 1898)
- June 10 – Heinrich von Herzogenberg, Austrian composer (d. 1900)
- June 11 – Francisco Joaquim Ferreira do Amaral, Portuguese naval commander and politician (d. 1923)
- June 12 – David Gill, Scottish astronomer (d. 1914)
- June 13 – Adolf Neuendorff, German American composer (d. 1897)
- June 14 – Richard Otto Zöpffel, Baltic German church historian and theologian (d. 1891)
- June 15 – Edvard Grieg, Norwegian composer (d. 1907)
- June 16 – David Popper, Bohemian cellist and composer (d. 1913)
- June 18 – René Pénicaud, French politician (d. 1899)
- June 19 – Charles-Édouard Lefebvre, French composer (d. 1917)
- June 23 – Otto Kuntze, German botanist (d. 1907)
- June 24 – Andreas Ascharin, Baltic-German chessmaster (d. 1896)
- June 25 – Prince Frederick of Hohenzollern-Sigmaringen, Member of the Hohenzollern Sigmaringen family (d. 1904)
- June 28 – Julius Runge, German landscape artist (d. 1922)
- June 30 – Sir Ernest Satow, British diplomat, scholar (d. 1928)

=== July ===
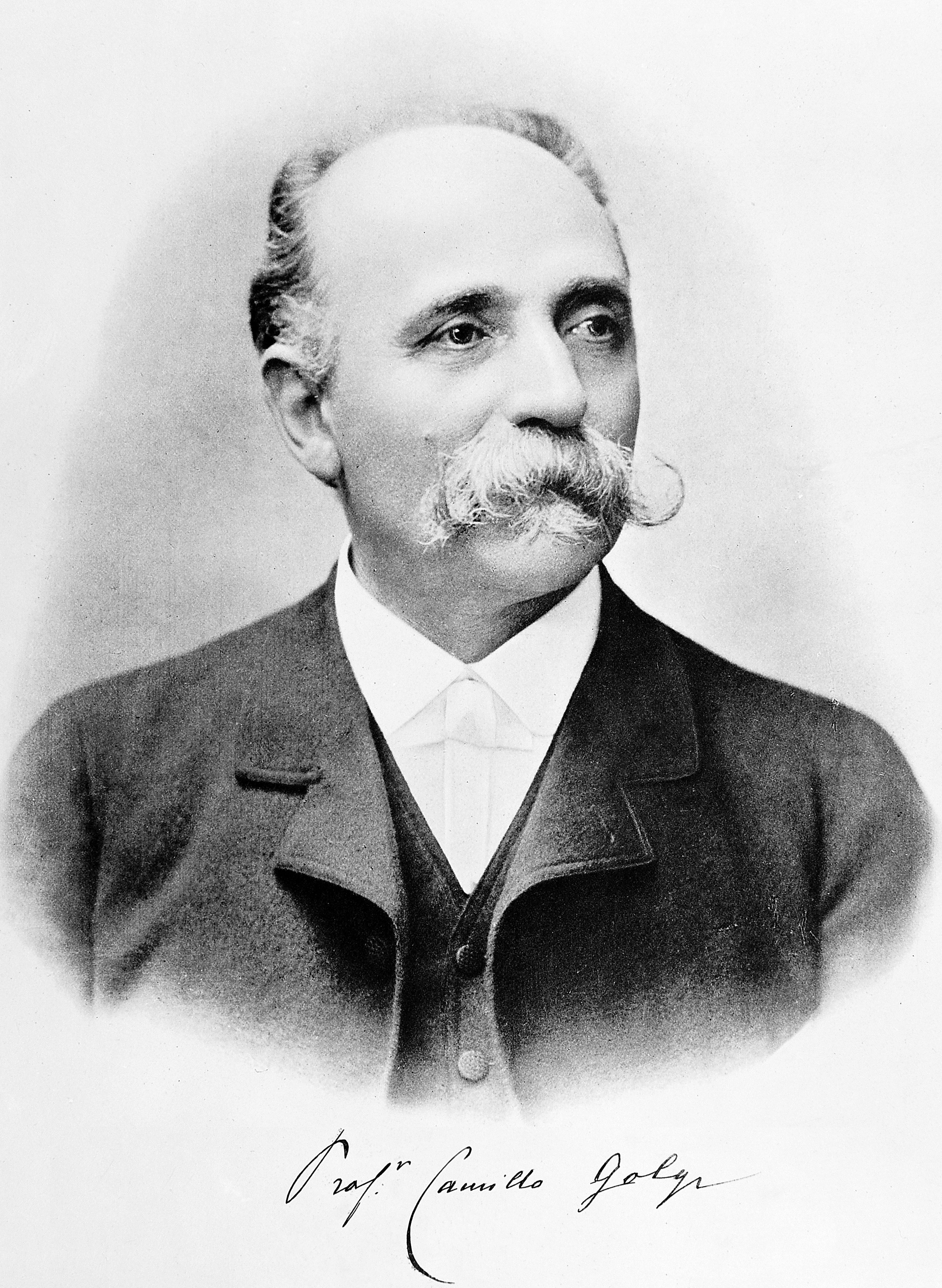
Camillo Golgi

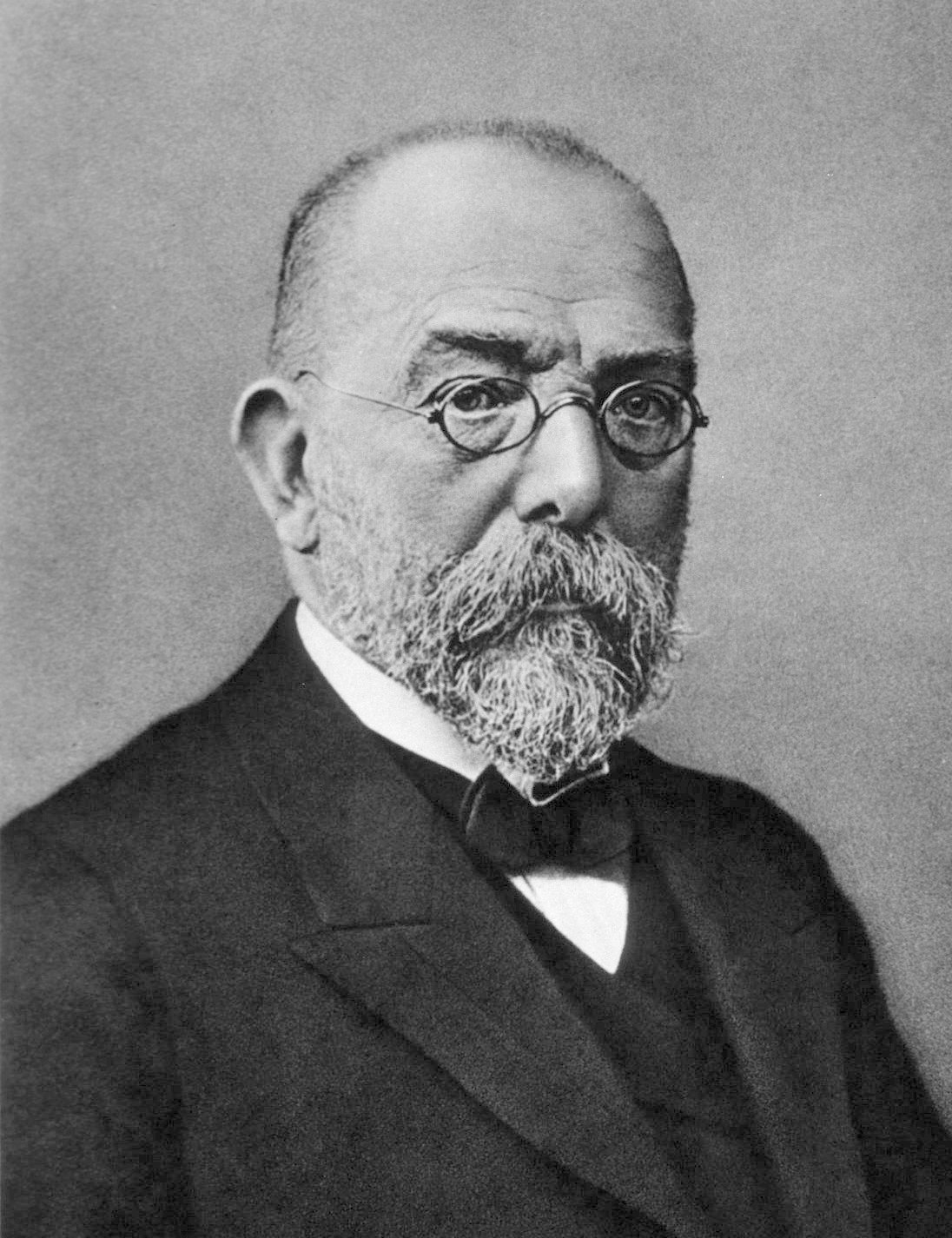
Robert Koch

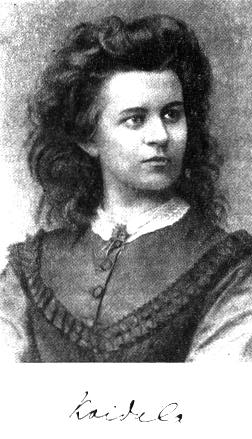
Lydia Koidula

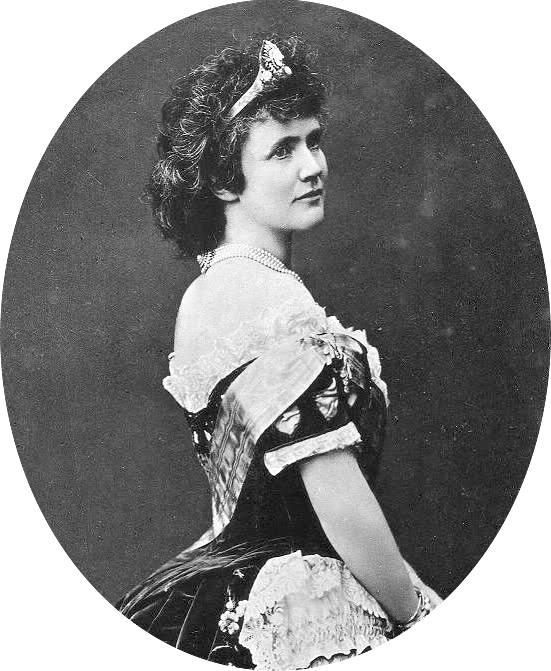
Queen Elisabeth of Wied

- July 7 – Camillo Golgi, Italian physician, recipient of the Nobel Prize in Physiology or Medicine (d. 1926)
- July 17 – Sir Penn Symons, British general (d. 1899)
- July 19 – Francis J. Higginson, United States Navy admiral (d. 1931)
- July 26 – J. B. C. Drew, American lawyer and politician (d. 1924)
- July 29 – Johannes Schmidt, German linguist (d. 1901)

=== August ===
- August – Joseph Abbott, Australian wool-broker and politician (d. 1903)
- August 1 – Robert Todd Lincoln, American politician, businessman, first son of U.S. President Abraham Lincoln (d. 1926)
- August 4 – Florimond Van Duyse, Belgian lawyer, composer and musicologist (d. 1910)
- August 5 – James Scott Skinner, Scottish violinist and composer (d. 1927)
- August 7 – Charles Warren Stoddard, American author (d. 1909)
- August 8 – Alfred Duclos DeCelles, Canadian journalist (d. 1925)
- August 9 – Adolf Mayer, German agricultural chemist (d. 1942)
- August 10 – Joseph McKenna, American politician, Associate Justice of the Supreme Court of the United States (d. 1926)
- August 11 – Louis Gathmann, German American inventor (d. 1917)
- August 12 – Colmar Freiherr von der Goltz, Prussian field marshal (d. 1916)
- August 15 – Charles Immanuel Forsyth Major, Scottish-born Swiss physician (d. 1923)
- August 17 – Mariano Rampolla, Italian Roman Catholic cardinal (d. 1913)
- August 18 – Moritz Brasch, German philosopher (d. 1895)
- August 19 – C. I. Scofield, American theologian (d. 1921)
- August 20 – Christina Nilsson, Swedish operatic soprano (d. 1921)
- August 21 – Marion McCarrell Scott, American educator (d. 1922)
- August 22 – John M. Thome, American astronomer (d. 1908)
- August 23 – William Southam, Canadian newspaper publisher (d. 1932)
- August 24 – Ernst Wülcker, German archivist and lexicographer (d. 1895)
- August 26 – Victor Gardthausen, German ancient historian (d. 1925)
- August 27 – Wilhelm Wisser, German dialectologist (d. 1935)
- August 28 – August Sedláček, Czech historian (d. 1926)
- August 29 – Alfred Agache, French painter (d. 1915)
- August 30 – Carl Theodor Albrecht, German astronomer (d. 1915)
- August 31 – Georg von Hertling, Chancellor of Germany (d. 1919)

=== September ===
- September 1 – William Ziegler, American industrialist (d. 1905)
- September 2 – Richard Alsop Wise, American educator (d. 1900)
- September 4
  - Charles Dilke, British statesman (d. 1911)
  - Jabez Balfour, English businessman and fraudster (d. 1916)
- September 5 – Friedrich Reusch, German sculptor (d. 1906)
- September 6 – Alexander Fok, Russian general (d. 1926)
- September 7 – Otto von Diederichs, German admiral (d. 1918)
- September 9 – Oscar Montelius, Swedish archaeologist (d. 1921)
- September 10 – William Gill, English explorer (d. 1882)
- September 11 – Adolf Wach, German jurist (d. 1926)
- September 12 – Daniel F. Davis, American politician and 37th governor of Maine (d. 1897)
- September 14 – Lola Rodríguez de Tió, Puerto Rican poet, abolitionist, and women's rights activist (d. 1924)
- September 16 – George Brettingham Sowerby III, British conchologist, publisher, illustrator (d. 1921)
- September 17 – William Elliot Griffis, American Congregationalist minister (d. 1928)
- September 18 – Charles Valentine Riley, British-born American entomologist and artist (d. 1895)
- September 19
  - Homer D. Call, American politician (d. 1929)
  - François-Xavier-Ovide Méthot, Quebec political figure (d. 1908)
- September 20 – Julius Lessing, German art historian (d. 1908)
- September 21 – Gabriel Paul Othenin de Cléron, comte d'Haussonville, French politician (d. 1924)
- September 22 – Pietro Respighi, Italian Roman Catholic cardinal (d. 1913)
- September 23 – Emily Warren Roebling, American engineer (d. 1903)
- September 24 – Carl Constantin Platen, German physician (d. 1899)
- September 25
  - Thomas Chrowder Chamberlin, American geologist (d. 1928)
  - Melville Reuben Bissell, American entrepreneur (d. 1889)
- September 26 – Joseph Furphy, Australian novelist (d. 1912)
- September 27 – Gaston Tarry, French mathematician (d. 1913)
- September 29 – Mikhail Skobelev, Russian general (d. 1882)
- September 30 – Hector Clare Cameron, Scottish surgeon (d. 1928)

=== October ===
- October 2 – James Whitney, Canadian politician (d. 1914)
- October 4 – Marie-Alphonsine Danil Ghattas, Palestinian Catholic nun, canonized (d. 1927)
- October 9 – Christian Christiansen, Danish physicist (d. 1917)
- October 10 – François C. Antoine Simon, 18th president of Haiti (d. 1923)
- October 12 – Émile Louis Ragonot, French entomologist (d. 1895)
- October 13 – René de Lespinasse, French historian (d. 1922)
- October 14 – Marcus Beck, early proponent of the germ theory of disease (d. 1893)
- October 15 – Herbert W. Ladd, American politician and governor of Rhode Island (d. 1913)
- October 16 – Johann Friedrich Ahlfeld, German obstetrician and gynecologist (d. 1929)
- October 17 – Lot Thomas, American state court judge (d. 1905)
- October 19 – Albert Viger, French politician (d. 1926)
- October 20 – Victor de Stuers, Dutch artist (d. 1916)
- October 22 – Anton Yegorovich von Saltza, Russian general (d. 1916)
- October 23 – René de Lespinasse, French historian (d. 1922)
- October 24 – Caroline Brown Buell, American activist (d. 1927)
- October 25 – Pierre Lallement, French inventor of the bicycle (d. 1891)
- October 26 – Henry Trimen, British botanist (d. 1896)
- October 28
  - Dezső Bánffy, 12th Prime Minister of Hungary (d. 1911)
  - Herman Bendell, Physician and last Superintendent of Indian Affairs for the Arizona Territory (d. 1932)
- October 29 – John Miller 1st governor of North Dakota (d. 1908)
- October 31 – Henri Regnault, French painter (d. 1871)

=== November ===
- November 3 – Isaac S. Struble, American politician (d. 1913)
- November 4 – Theodor Gartner, Austrian linguist (d. 1925)
- November 5 – Harry Rawson, English explorer and 21st governor of New South Wales (d. 1919)
- November 6 – Job Adams Cooper, American politician (d. 1899)
- November 7 – Heinrich Friedrich Weber, German physicist (d. 1912)
- November 8 – Moritz Pasch, German mathematician (d. 1930)
- November 11 – Cornelius Vanderbilt II, American railway magnate (d. 1899)
- November 13 – Friedrich Albin Hoffmann, German internist (d. 1924)
- November 14 – Theodor Wilhelm Engelmann, German botanist (d. 1909)
- November 15 – Joseph König (chemist), German chemist (d. 1930)
- November 16 – Louise Jopling, English painter (d. 1933)
- November 19 – C. X. Larrabee, American businessman (d. 1914)
- November 21 – Gaston Tissandier, French chemist, meteorologist, aviator and editor (d. 1899)
- November 22 – Albert Huntington Chester, American geologist (d. 1903)
- November 24 – Ekaterina Junge, Russian painter (d. 1913)
- November 25 – Henry Ware Eliot, American industrialist (d. 1919)
- November 27
  - Edwin C. Burleigh, American politician, 42nd governor of Maine (d. 1916)
  - Thomas Perrett, Sgt in the Confederate States Army and North Carolina State Senator (d. 1923)
- November 28 – Émile Bernard (composer), French composer (d. 1902)
- November 29
  - Gertrude Jekyll, English garden designer, writer and artist (d. 1932)
  - Peter Birch-Reichenwald, Norwegian politician (d. 1898)
- November 30 – Martha Ripley, American physician (d. 1912)

=== December ===
- December 3 – Sir William Gatacre, British general (d. 1906)
- December 11 – Robert Koch, German physician, recipient of the Nobel Prize in Physiology or Medicine (d. 1910)
- December 24 – Lydia Koidula, Estonian poet (d. 1886)
- December 28 – Prentiss Ingraham, American author of dime fiction (d. 1904)
- December 29 – Elisabeth of Wied, Queen consort of Romania (d. 1916)

=== Full date unknown ===
- Luis Cadarso y Rey de Andrade, Spanish naval officer (d. 1898)
- Adelaida Lukanina, Russian chemist (d. 1908)
- Rafael Monleón y Torres, Spanish painter, archaeologist and historian (d. 1900)
- Giangiacomo Moretti, Italian painter (d. ?)

== Deaths ==
=== January–June ===
- January 11
  - Antoine Bournonville, French ballet dancer, choreographer (b. 1760)
  - Francis Scott Key, American songwriter of The Star-Spangled Banner (b. 1779)
- February 13 – Nathaniel Chipman, United States federal judge (b. 1752)
- February 26 – Sir John Thomas Jones, British army general (b. 1783)
- March 3 – David Porter, American naval officer (b. 1780)
- March 21
  - Guadalupe Victoria, 1st President of Mexico (b. 1786)
  - Robert Southey, English poet (b. 1774)
- March 25 – Robert Murray M'Cheyne, Scottish clergyman (b. 1813)
- March 27 – Karl Salomo Zachariae von Lingenthal, German jurist (b. 1769)
- April 17 – Samuel Morey, American inventor (b. 1762)
- May 23 – Pierre Lorillard II, American businessman (b. 1764)
- May 28 – Noah Webster, American lexicographer (b. 1758)
- June 1 – William Abbot, English actor (b. 1798)
- June 7 – Friedrich Hölderlin, German writer (b. 1770)

=== July–December ===
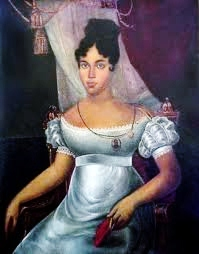
Marie-Madeleine Lachenais

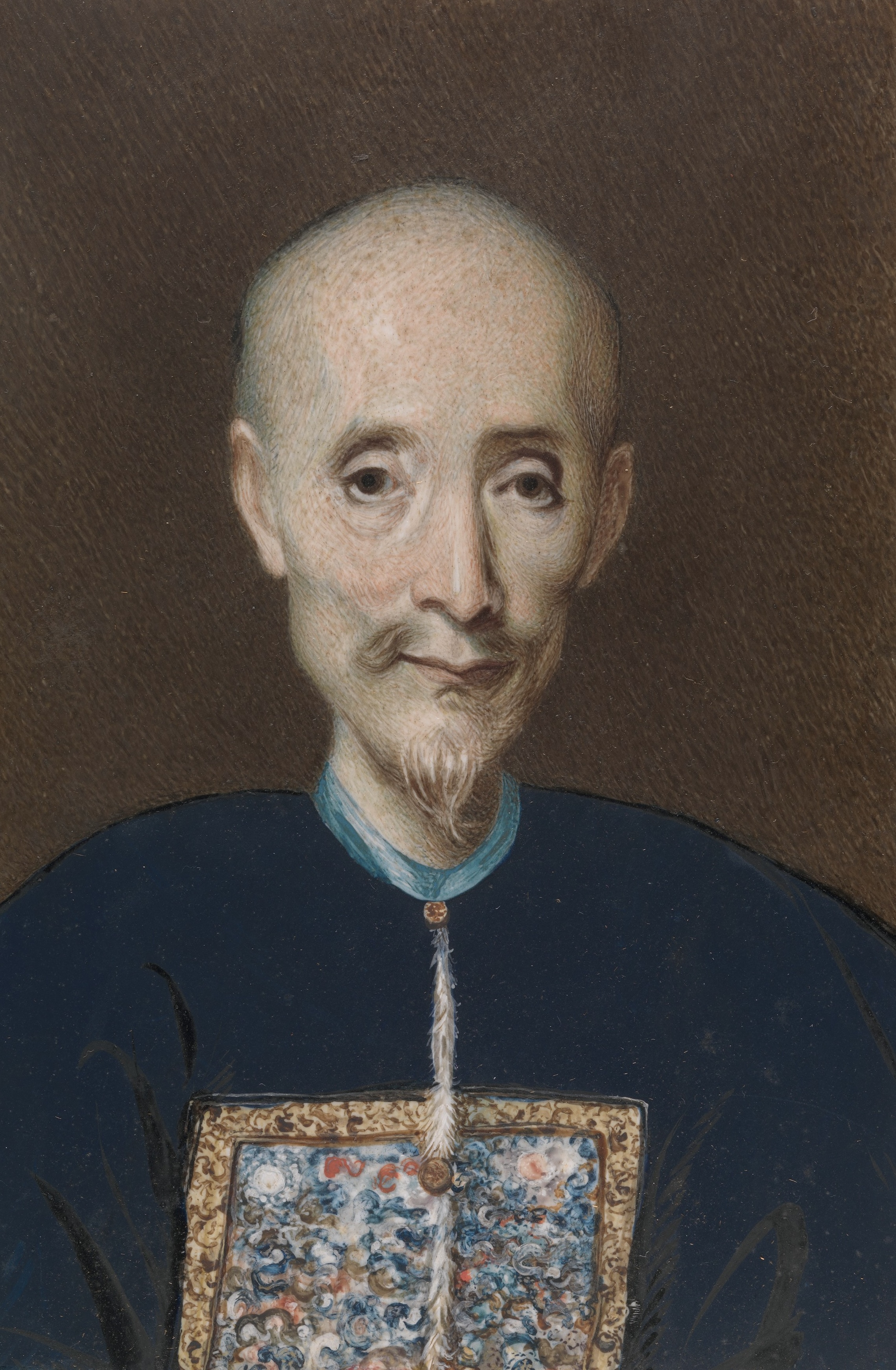
Howqua

- July 2 – Samuel Hahnemann, German physician (b. 1755)
- July 7 – John Holmes, American politician (b. 1773)
- July 14 – Miguel de Álava, Spanish soldier, statesman (b. 1770)
- August – Sequoyah, Native American silversmith, creator of the Cherokee syllabary (b. c. 1767)
- July 22 – Marie-Madeleine Lachenais, Haitian de facto politician (b. 1778)
- July 25 – Charles Macintosh, Scottish chemist and inventor of a waterproof fabric (b. 1766)
- September 4 – Howqua, Chinese merchant, "richest man in the world" (b. 1769)
- September 11 – Joseph Nicollet, French geographer (b. 1786)
- September 16 – Ezekiel Hart, Canadian entrepreneur, politician (b. 1767 or 1770)
- October 6 – Sir Archibald Campbell, 1st Baronet, British army general (b. 1769)
- October 18 – Ebenezer Elmer, American politician (b. 1752)
- November – Esther Leach, English-Indian actress and director (b. 1809)
- November 10 – John Trumbull, American painter (b. 1756)
- December 12 – King William I of the Netherlands (b. 1772)
- December 18 – Thomas Graham, 1st Baron Lynedoch, British Governor-General of India (b. 1748)

=== Date unknown ===
- Emma Jane Greenland, English painter (b. 1760)
