= Venancio =

Venancio (Spanish or Tagalog), Venâncio (Portuguese), Venanzio (Italian) or Venantius (Latin) is a masculine given name. Venâncio is also a Portuguese surname. It may refer to

== Given name ==
Venancio

- Venancio Concepción, Filipino army general
- Venancio Costa (born 1967), Spanish volleyball player
- Venancio García (1921–1994), Spanish footballer
- Venancio Flores (1808–1868), Uruguayan political leader and general
- Venancio José (born 1976), Spanish sprinter
- Venancio López (1830-1870), Paraguayan military officer
- Venancio Víctor López (1862-1927), Paraguayan chancellor
- Venancio Antonio Morin (1843–1919), Venezuelan military officer and politician
- Venancio Ramos (born 1959), football striker from Uruguay
- Venancio Roberto, 19th century governor of Guam
- Venancio Serrano, Filipino military officer
- Venancio Shinki (1932–2016), Peruvian painter

Venanzio

- Giuseppe Venanzio Marvuglia (1729–1814), Italian architect
- Venanzio da Camerino, 16th century Italian painter
- Venanzio Nocchi (1946–2025), Italian politician
- Venanzio Ortis (born 1955), Italian long-distance runner
- Venanzio Rauzzini (1746–1810), Italian composer, pianist, singing teacher and concert impresario

Venantius

- Venantius Fortunatus (530–600), Latin poet, bishop, and saint
- Venantius of Camerino (d. 250), a.k.a. Saint Venanzio, martyr, patron saint of Camerino
- Venantius, brother of Saint Honoratus (350–429)
- Venantius (consul 507), consul and son of Liberius
- Venantius (fl. 517–537), Bishop of the Roman Catholic Diocese of Viviers
- Venantius of Salona, a Bishop of Salona
- Venantius of Berri, an Abbot

Venâncio

- Venâncio Mondlane (born 1974), Mozambican politician
- Venâncio da Silva Moura (1942–1999), Minister of External Relations of Angola

== Surname ==
- Célio Gabriel de Almeida Venâncio (born 1986), Brazilian footballer
- Cris Cyborg (born Cristiane Justino Venâncio in 1985), American-Brazilian mixed martial artist
- Fernando Venâncio (1944–2025), Portuguese-Dutch writer
- Frederico Venâncio (born 1993), Portuguese footballer
- Kauiza Venancio (born 1987), Brazilian sprinter
- Liliana Venâncio (born 1995), Angolan handball player
- Ceará (footballer) (born Marcos Venâncio de Albuquerque in 1980), Brazilian footballer
- Osman Menezes Venâncio Júnior (born 1992), Brazilian footballer
- Pedro Venâncio (born 1963), Portuguese footballer
- Rudimar Venâncio (born 1984), Brazilian futsal player
- Scylla Venâncio (born 1917), Brazilian swimmer
- Tiago Venâncio (born 1987), Portuguese swimmer
- Xavier Venâncio (born 1999), Portuguese footballer

== See also ==
- Venâncio Aires, a city in Brazil
