= Pénicaud =

Pénicaud is a surname. Notable people with the surname include:

- Cédric Pénicaud (born 1971), French swimmer
- Éric Pénicaud (born 1952), French classical composer, classical guitarist, and improviser
- Muriel Pénicaud (born 1955), French human resources professional and minister
- René Pénicaud (1843—1899), French politician and lawyer
