= Wilhelm Wiesberg =

Austrian writer and folksinger (1850–1896)

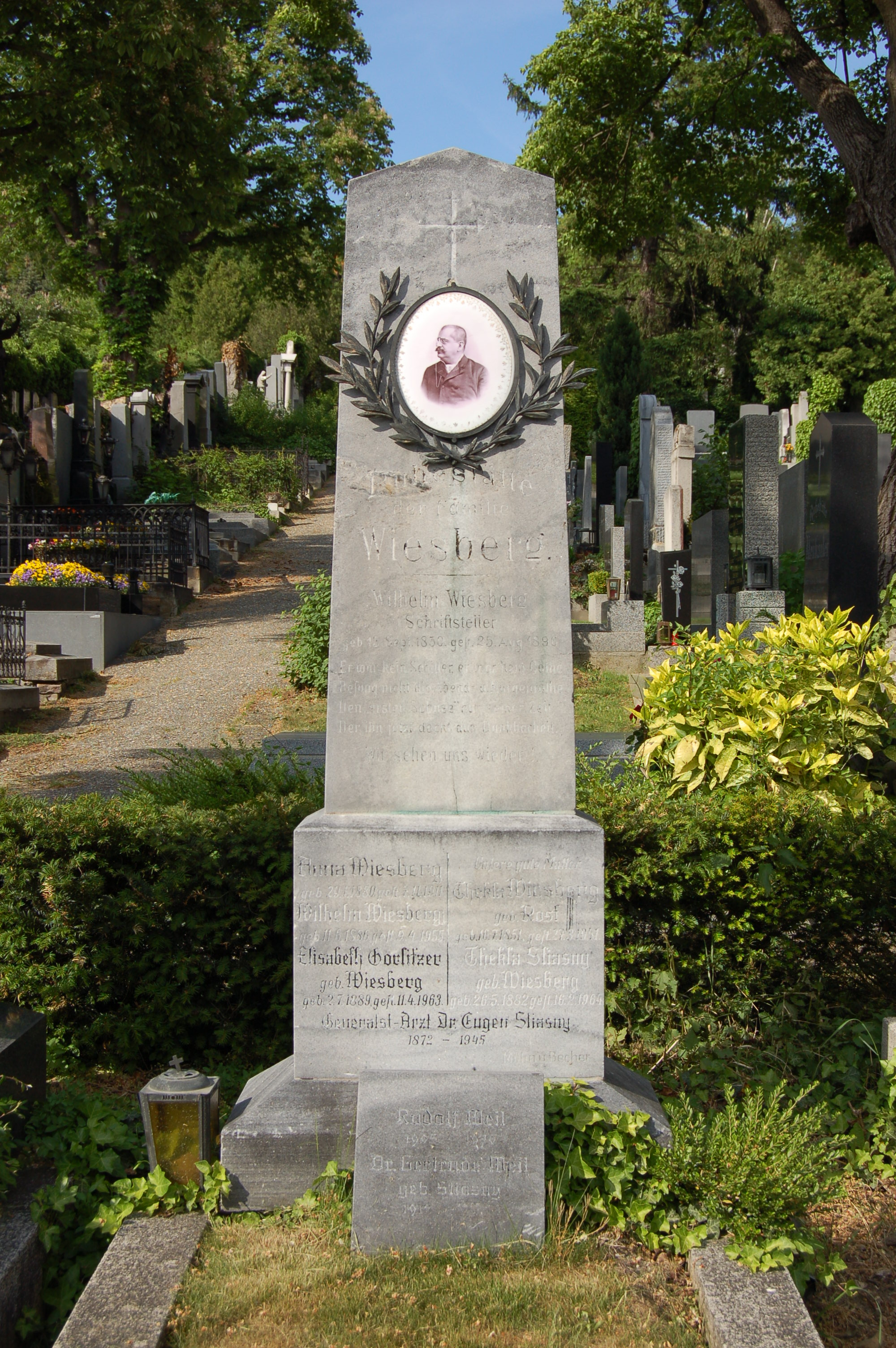
Grave of Wilhelm Wiesberg

Wilhelm Wiesberg (13 September 1850 – 25 August 1896), real name Wilhelm Bergamenter, was an Austrian writer and folksinger.

== Life ==
Born in Vienna, Wiesberg acted in children's comedies at the Vienna Theater in der Josefstadt and was an employee of the magazines Figaro, Kikeriki, Zeitgeist and Der Floh. After he lost his job, he became a folk singer. Wiesberg wrote 72 Posse mit Gesang, 30 solo scenes and more than 1000 songs. He often worked together with Johann Sioly and Wilhelm Seidl.

Wiesberg died in Vienna at age 45. His grave is located at the Dornbacher Friedhof in Vienna (Gruppe 3, Nummer 12).

== Work ==
- 1875: Der Kaninchenfresser, Schwank mit Gesang.
- 1885, 1886: Mein’ Vaterstadt in Lied und Wort. [5 volumes].
- 1885: Wiener Couplets für Pianoforte und Gesang, gesungen von Wiesberg.
- 1885: Duette für 2 Singstimmen und Pianoforte v. Seidl und Wiesberg.
- 1890: Eine kleine Tanz-Chronik
- 1891: À la Klapphorn. Posse.
- 1893: Fest-Gedicht zur 25jähr. Gründungs-Feier des demokratischen Vereines am Neubau.
- 1894: Draußt und herinn, couplet for Josef Modl
- All's fahrt am Rad!, Scherzlied, music Johann Sioly
- Da hat der Aff a Freud
- Das is G'schmacksachn, komisches Originallied
- Der Trompeter von Säckingen, Solo scene for Josef Modl
- Die letzte Stunde eines Junggesellen, Solo scene
- Die Näherin!, music: Johann Sioly
