= Konstanze Dahn =

German actress (1814–1894)

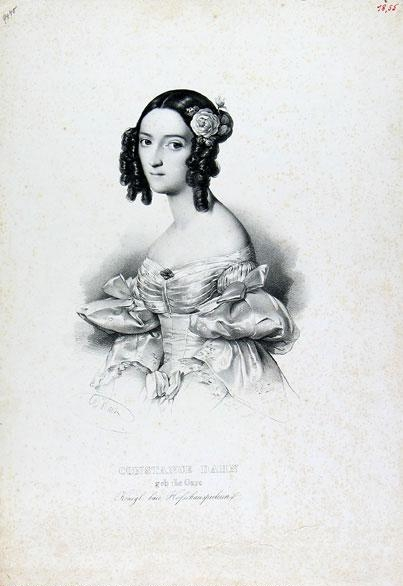
- Born: Constance Le Gaye; 12 June 1814; Kassel, Electorate of Hesse
- Died: 26 March 1894 (aged 79); Munich, German Empire
- Spouse: Friedrich Dahn (m. 1833–1850)
- Children: 3: Felix; Ludwig

Konstanze Dahn, born Constance Le Gaye (12 June 1814 in Kassel, † 26 March 1894 in Munich) was a German actress of French-Huguenot origin.

== Early life ==
Dahn was born as the youngest daughter of Kapellmeister A. (also: Charles) Le Gaye and his wife Antoinette, née Schäfer. Both parents served as musicians at the royal-Westphalian court of Jérôme Bonaparte in Kassel, where the daughter also received her first artistic lessons. In 1821, at the age of seven, she completed her debut at the Theater in Düsseldorf in the role of the "Donauwibchen". Wilhelm von Schadow painted it there as Mignon.

== Career ==
On 29 June 1831 she was able to record her greatest success in the role of "Gretchen". Her congenial opponent was the actor Heinrich Marr. With this appearance, the 17-year-old under her birth name "Mlle. Le Gaye "in the German-speaking area.

In June 1833, Constanze Dahn completed a first successful guest performance at the Royal Court Theater in Munich and was there from the spot. She remained a member of the ensemble until her life. She gave her official farewell performance on 1 October 1865 in the role of the "Duchess of Parma" in Goethe's Egmont.

== Personal life ==
In 1831 she met the actor Friedrich Dahn and married him in Hamburg on 15 April 1833. With him she had two sons, Felix (1834–1912) and Ludwig (1843–1898) and a daughter of the same name, Constanze (1846–1933), who under the pseudonym "C. Hirundo" was literarily active. [1] The marriage of Friedrich and Constanze Dahn turned out very unhappy and was finally dissolved in 1850.

== Death ==
Dahn retired to private life and died at the age of nearly 80 years on 26 March 1894 in Munich. In his funeral oration, Ernst von Possart called her "the Duse of Munich".

The tomb of Constanze Dahn is located on the old southern cemetery in Munich (wall right place at SP 21 cemetery 18) location. In the tomb is also her son Ludwig (1843–1898).
