= Ludwig Dahn =

German actor (1843–1898)

- Born: March 12, 1843; Munich, Kingdom of Bavaria
- Died: October 20, 1898 (aged 55); Munich, German Empire
- Children: 1
- Parents: Konstanze Dahn; Friedrich Dahn
- Relatives: Felix Dahn (brother)

Ludwig Dahn (born March 12, 1843 – October 20, 1898) was a German actor.

== Early life ==
Dahn was the son of actor Friedrich Dahn and his first wife Konstanze Dahn; his older brother was the writer Felix Dahn. Dahn received his first artistic instruction from his mother; later he became a student of actress Sophie Schröder.

== Career ==
Through their mediation he came to the Weimar court theatre at the age of 17. There he was able to debut in September of the same year successfully in the role of "Leopold". There he remained until 1864 member of the ensemble and worked in almost all royal dramas Shakespeare.

In 1865, Dahn moved to the Prussian Court Theatre in Berlin as the "first adolescent lover" and remained there until the German-French War, before returning to Berlin. There he also married and had a son, Felix (1874). In September 1873 he accepted a commitment to the German Theatre in St. Petersburg. He worked there from spring 1874 to summer 1877 and then returned to Germany.

== Death ==
In 1878 he was brought to the royal court theatre in Munich and played there until the end of his life. He made his debut in Munich in the role of "Kosinsky". In his last years, Dahn was constantly plagued by illnesses and could not repeat on stage his previous successes. At the age of 55 Dahn died on 20 October 1898 in Munich.

== Burial ==
The burial place of Ludwig Dahn is located in the grave of his mother Konstanze Dahn on the Old Southern Cemetery in Munich location .
