= William Unger =

German etcher and engraver

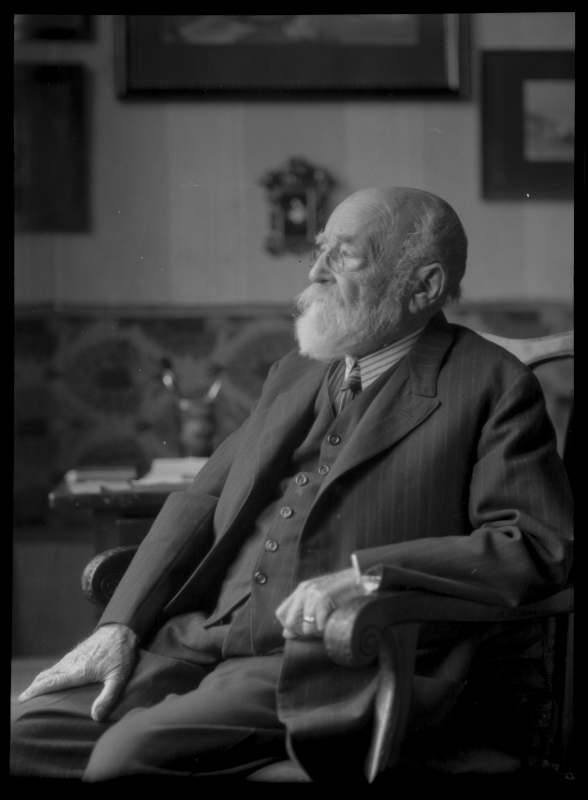
William Unger; photograph by Ferdinand Schmutzer (after 1900)

William Unger, or Wilhelm Unger (11 September 1837, Hanover – 5 March 1932, Innsbruck) was a German etcher and engraver.

== Biography ==
His father was the jurist and art historian, Friedrich Wilhelm Unger. While he was still a toddler, his family moved to Göttingen. Both he and his older sister, Johanna displayed artistic talent at an early age. Her interests turned to painting, while he became more involved with etching. Beginning in 1854, he studied at the Kunstakademie Düsseldorf with the engraver, Joseph von Keller then, in 1858, transferred to the Academy of Fine Arts Munich, where he studied with Julius Thaeter, who specialized in copper engraving.

He returned to Göttingen in 1859. The following year, his father agreed to finance more studies in Düsseldorf. The next three years proved to be disappointing and difficult. An apprentice with the engraver, Franz Paul Massau did not turn out as planned. It became harder to work, and he felt that he was a burden on his father. Eventually, he became ill. After a few weeks of recuperation, he returned home to help take care of Johanna, who was also ill.

When his depression lifted, he began travelling; to Kassel, Dresden, Vienna and Venice. He finally went to Leipzig, seeking work with one of the publishers there. He found employment with E. A. Seemann in 1866, providing illustrations for their Zeitschrift für bildende Kunst (Journal of Fine Art). He was engaged in this work for several years. He also published books with reproductions of famous paintings. He married in 1870 and was appointed a Professor at the Grand-Ducal Saxon Art School, Weimar, in 1871.

He spent most of his summers from 1871 to 1877 visiting art galleries in the Netherlands. Later, he settled in Vienna, where he took over management of the University of Applied Arts in 1881. He was elected a member of the Royal Swedish Academy of Fine Arts in 1884, and was named a Professor at the Academy of Fine Arts, Vienna, in 1894. His students included Alfred Cossmann, Rudolf Jettmar, Oswald Roux and Ferdinand Schmutzer.

Following his retirement in 1908, he spent most of his time creating drawings and watercolors. His wife died in 1919, and he went to live with his daughter, Else, in Innsbruck. In 1928 his autobiography, Aus meinem Leben (From my Life), was published by the Gesellschaft für vervielfältigende Kunst.

== Selected works ==
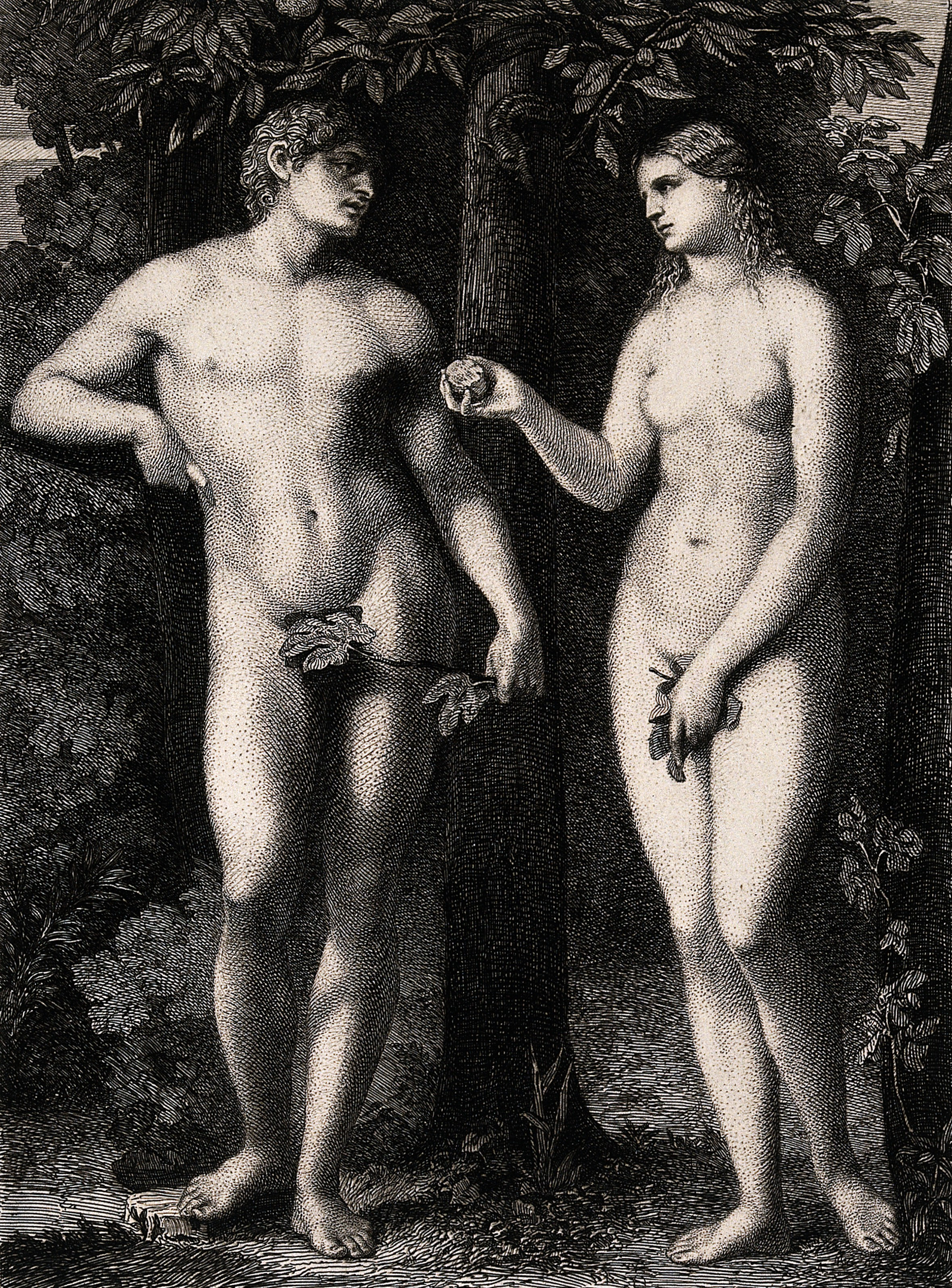
Eve Showing Adam
the Apple

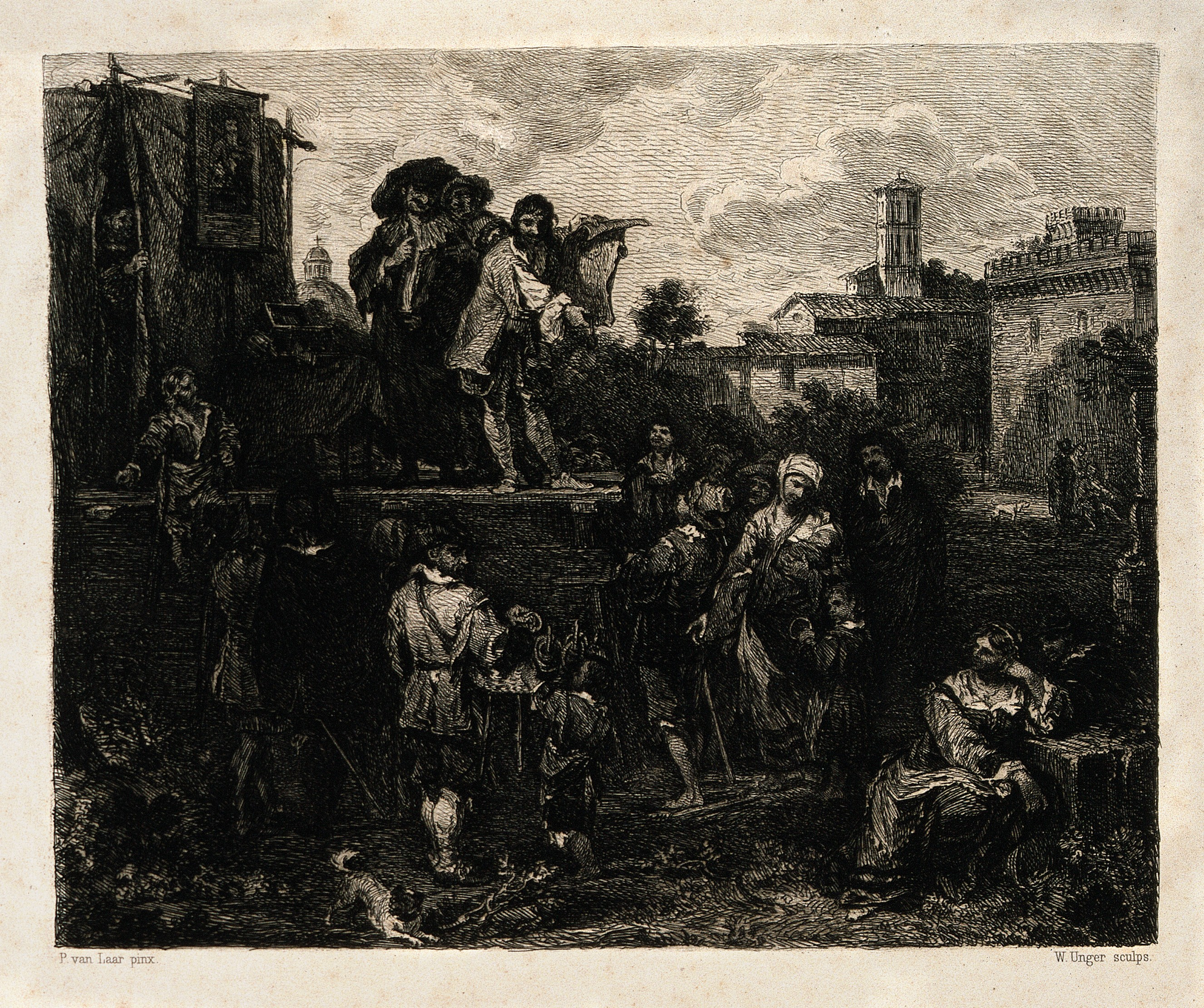
An Itinerant Medicine Vendor in Rome

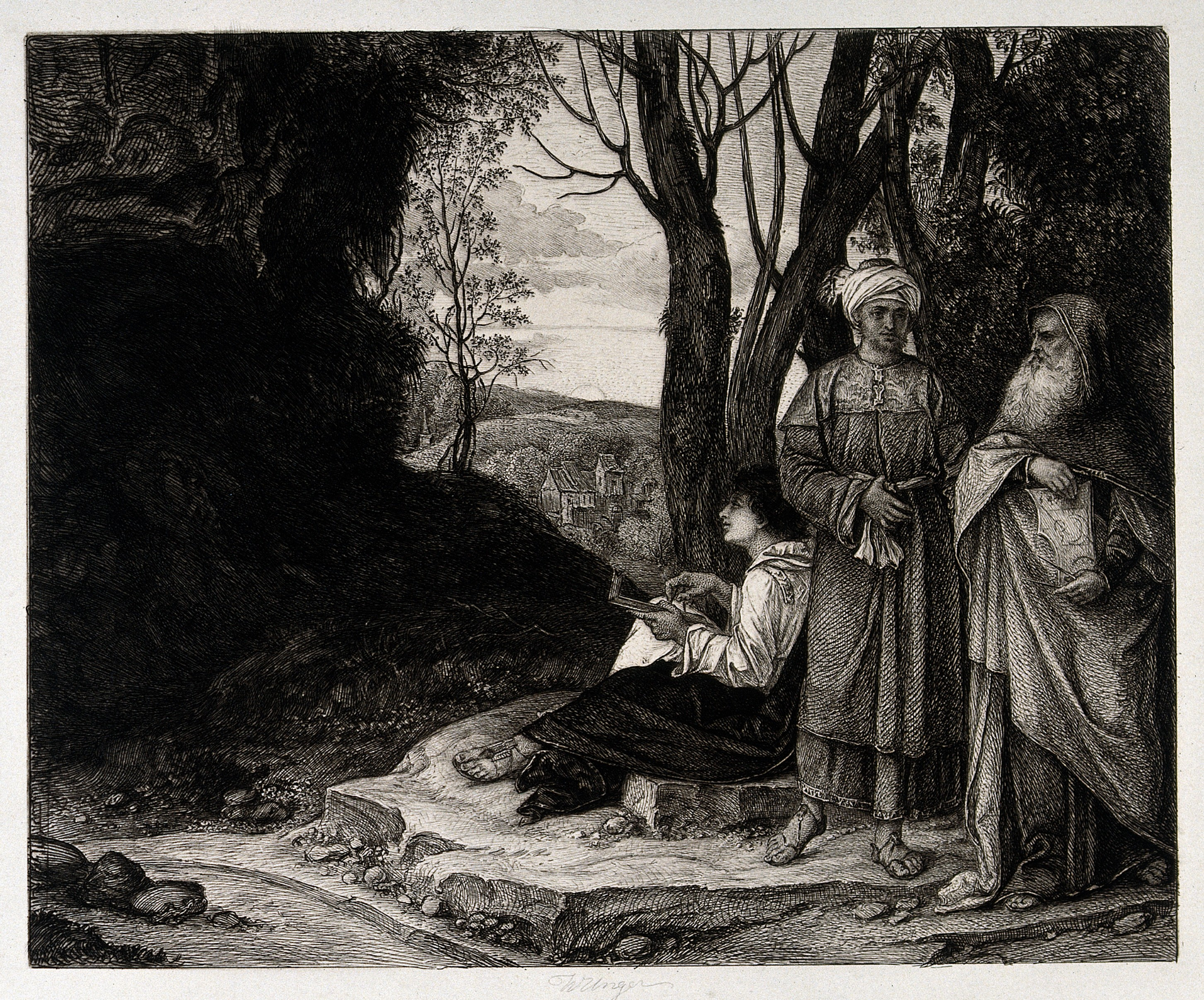
The Three Philosophers, after Giorgione

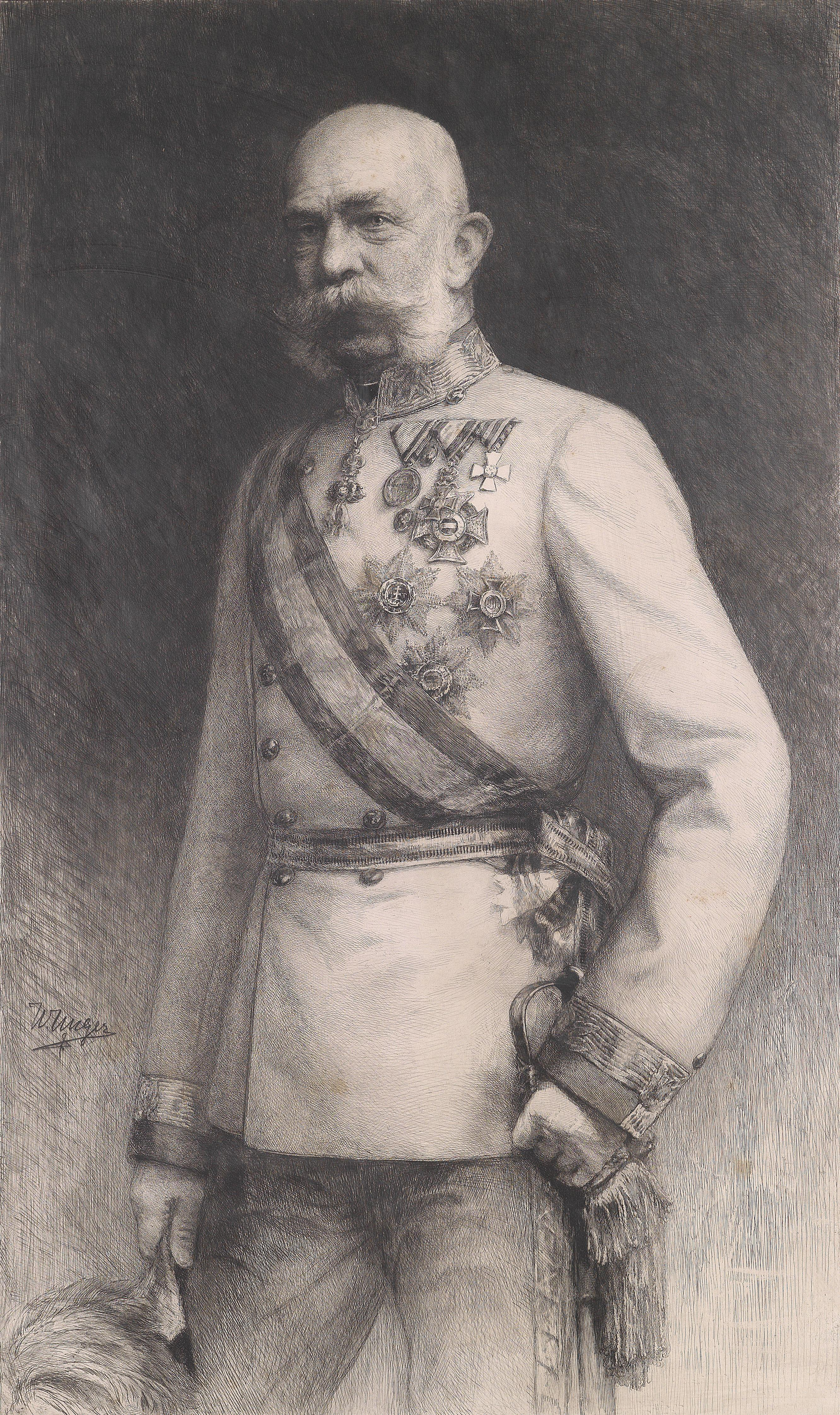
Emperor Franz Joseph

== Sources ==
- Biography of Unger @ Ober St.Veit
- Unger, William. In: Friedrich von Boetticher: Malerwerke des neunzehnten Jahrhunderts. Beitrag zur Kunstgeschichte. Dresden 1898, Vol.2, pg.909
- Ellen Hastaba: "Unger, William". In: Österreichisches Biographisches Lexikon 1815–1950 (ÖBL). Vol. 15, Austrian Academy of Sciences, Vienna 2018, ISBN 978-3-7001-8383-9, p. 105 f. (Direct links to "p. 105", "p. 106")
