= Adolf Eberle =

German painter

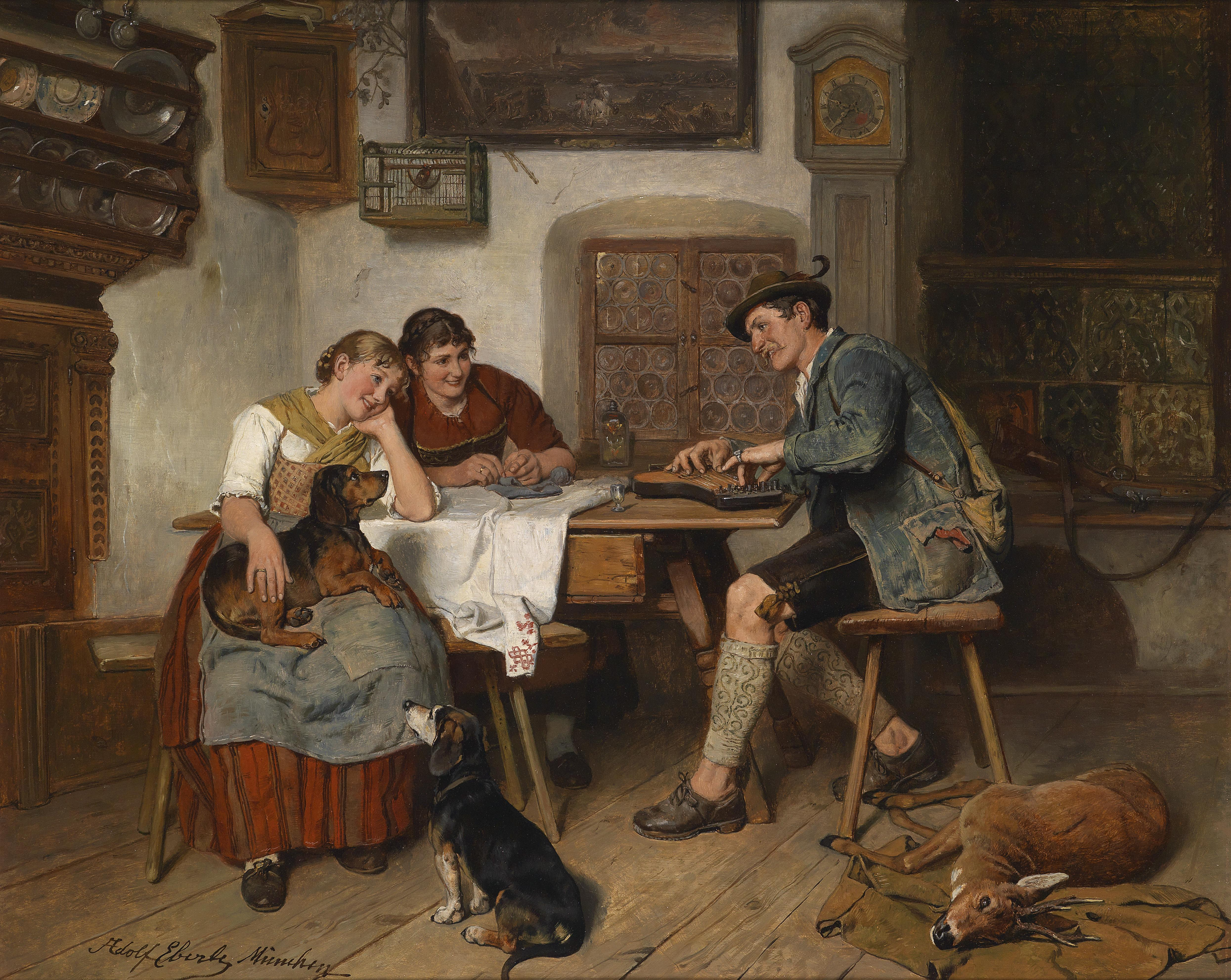
Musikalische Unterhaltung auf der Alm (Musical entertainment in the Alpine pasture, 1914)

Adolf Eberle (11 January 1843 – 24 January 1914) was a German painter who specialised in genre painting, particularly of Bavarian and Tyrolean farmers and huntsmen.

== Biography ==
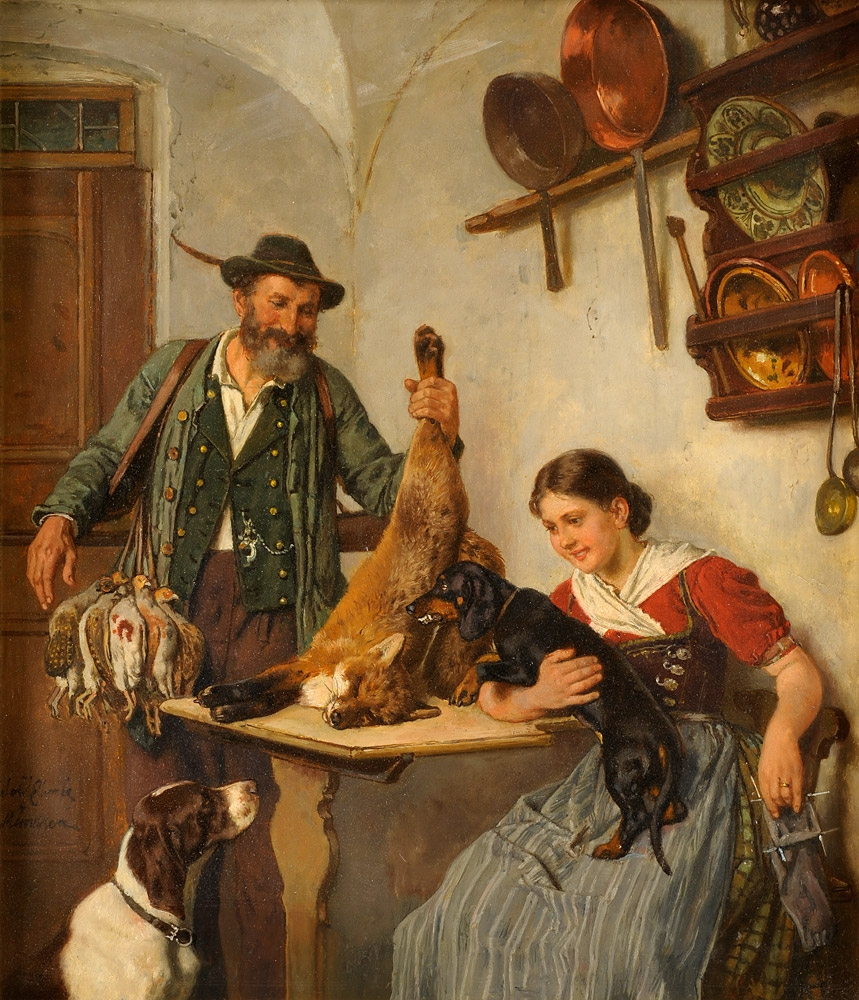
Adolf Eberle: Eine erfolgreiche Jagd

Eberle was born in Munich; his father, Robert Eberle, was also a painter. At the Academy of Fine Arts, Munich, he studied under Karl von Piloty beginning in 1860. He achieved success the following year with a painting called Pfändung der letzten Kuh (mortgaging the last cow), of which William Unger made an engraving.

After spending some time depicting soldiers in the Thirty Years' War and the Seven Years' War, he returned to subjects from Bavarian and Tyrolean peasant life. At the 1879 international exposition in Munich, his Erster Rehbock (first stag) was well received. A painting of his with the translated title Childhood Fun was sold for $16,800 at Bonhams in San Francisco in 2007, and another with the translated title The Day's Bag for £7,500 at Christie's in London in 2012.

Eberle died in Munich in 1914. In 1952 Eberlestraße in the Solln neighbourhood of Munich was named after him.

== Selected works ==
- Pfändung der letzten Kuh (1861) (Mortgaging the last cow)
- Erster Rehbock (1879) (First stag)
- Feldschule in Wallensteins Lager (field instruction in Wallenstein's camp)
- Die verunglückte Musikprobe (Music test gone wrong)
- Der Hochzeitstag (Wedding day)
- Nach der Taufe (After the baptism)
- Zitherunterricht (Zither lesson)
- Das Tischgebet (grace)
- Verspätetes Mittagessen des heimgekehrten Försters (forester's late lunch after returning home)

== Paintings ==
Paintings by Adolf Eberle

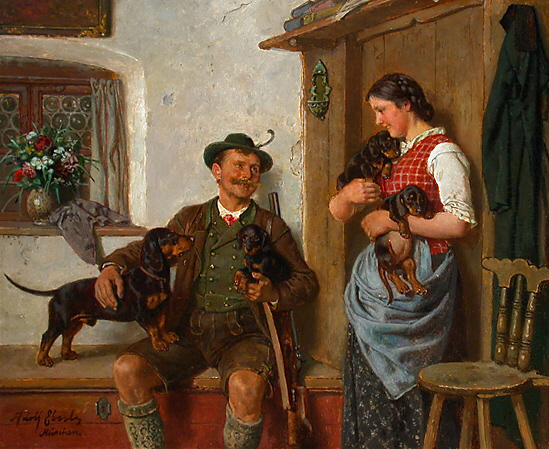
Die Dackelfamilie mit Jäger und Magd (Family of dachshunds with huntsman and girl)

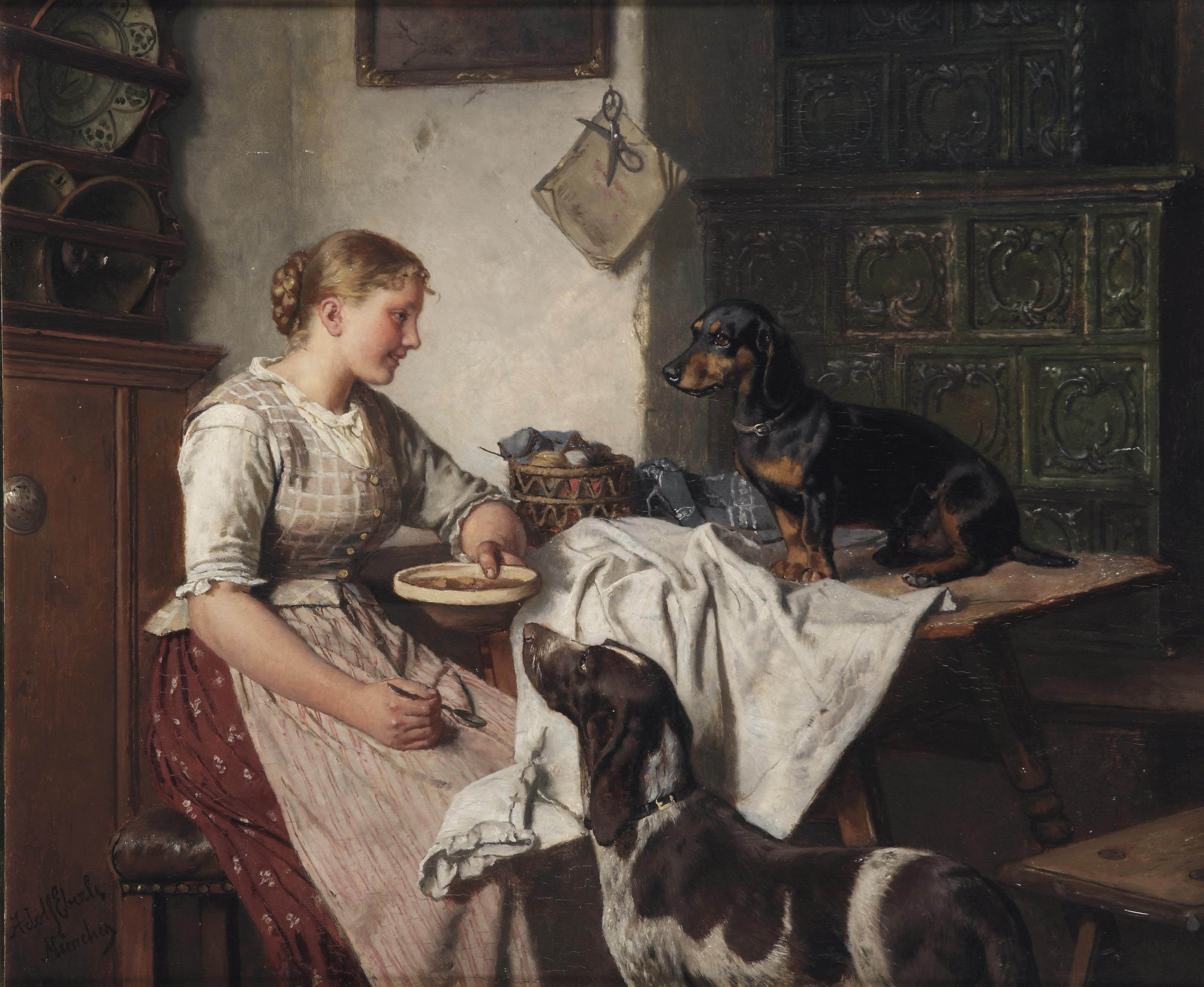
Füttern der Hunde (Feeding the dogs)

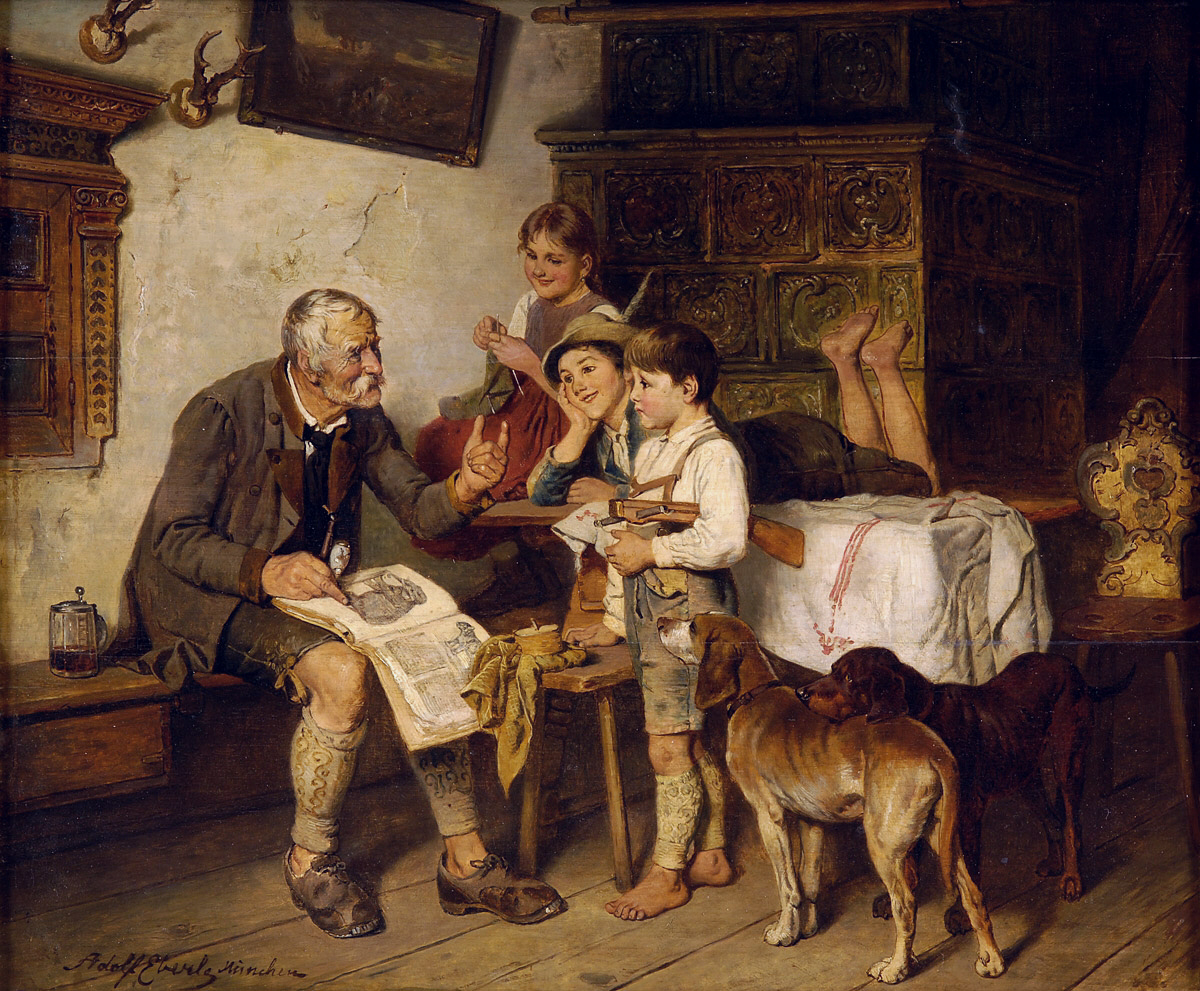
Die Naturkunde-Stunde (Nature study)

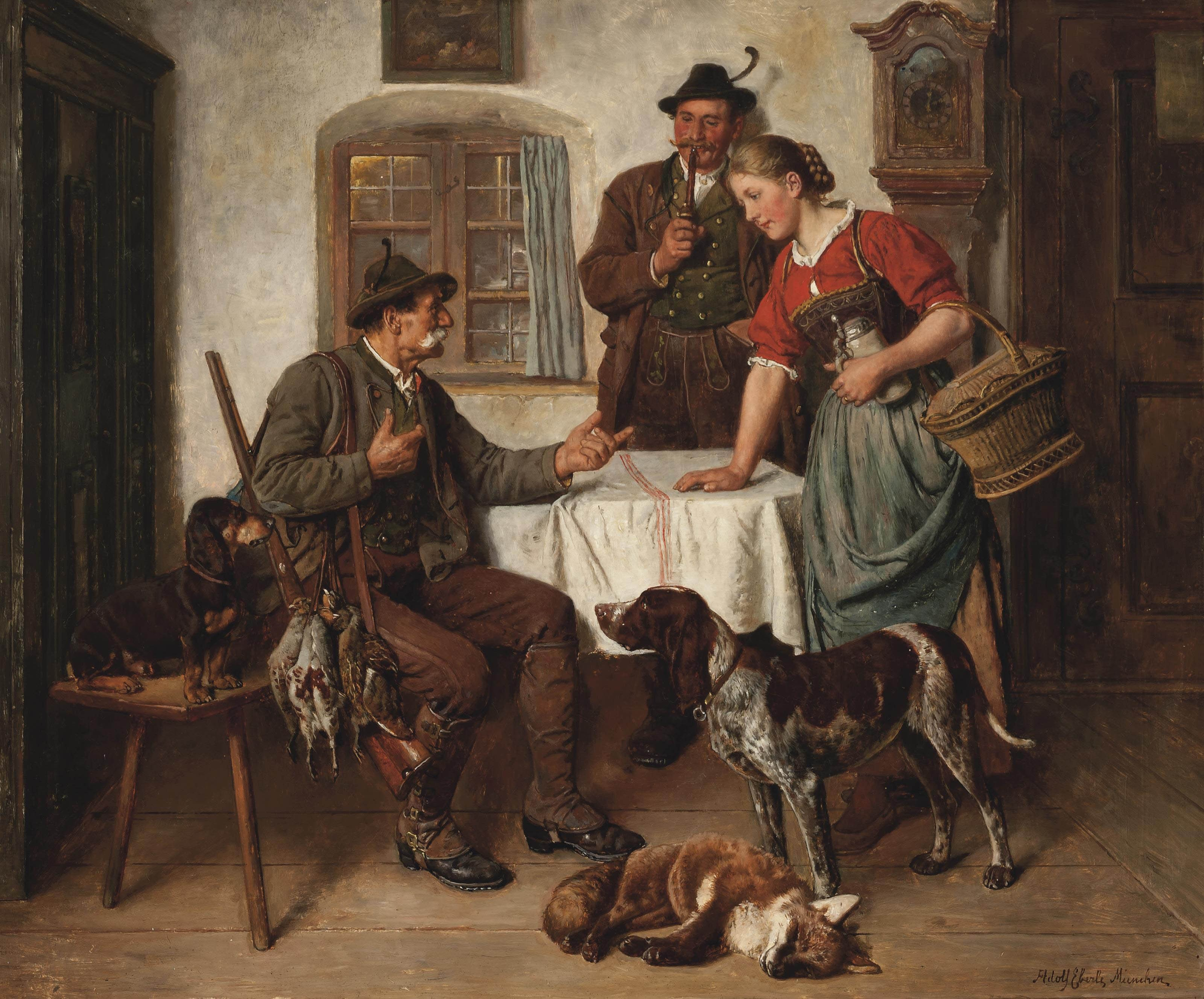
The day's bag
