= Friedrich Dahn =

German actor

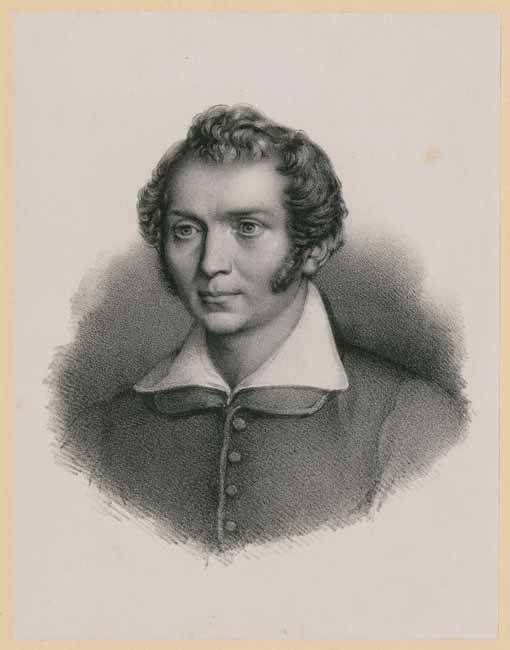
- Born: 18 April 1811; Berlin, Kingdom of Prussia
- Died: 9 December 1889 (aged 78); Munich, German Empire
- Spouses: Konstanze Dahn (m. 1833–1850) Marie Dahn-Hausmann (m. 1834–1889)
- Children: 3: Felix; Ludwig

Friedrich Dahn (born 18 April 1811 in Berlin – 9 December 1889 in Munich) was a German actor and director.

== Early life ==
At the request of his family, Dahn began to study theology at the university of his hometown. Already during his studies, he was interested in the stage and occasionally appeared on private amateur stages. After he had finished his studies without a degree he made his debut in 1829 under Karl Friedrich Cerf at the Royal City Theatre. Later he was engaged as a "youthful lover" at the Municipal Theatre Wroclaw.

== Personal life ==
When in 1831 the actor Gustav Emil Devrient moved from Hamburg to Dresden, Dahn was appointed successor to the Hamburg City Theatre. In Hamburg, Dahn married on 15 April 1833, the actress Constanze Le Gaye and had with her two sons, Felix (1834–1912) and Ludwig (1843–1898) and a daughter. The marriage was quite unhappy and the two divorced in 1850 again.

In 1834, Dahn was brought to the Royal Court Theatre in Munich, where he remained engaged until the end of his life. There he married his second wife, the actress and colleague Marie Dahn-Hausmann.

== Death ==
At the age of 78, Friedrich Dahn died in Munich on 9 December 1889, where he found his final resting place.
