= René Pénicaud =

French politician (1843–1899)

Mayor of Limoges
- In office 1876–1881

Personal details
- Born: June 18, 1843 Limoges, France
- Died: November 23, 1899 (aged 56) Aureil, France
- Occupation: Politician; Lawyer

René Pénicaud (18 June 1843 — 23 November 1899) was a French politician and lawyer.

He was served as mayors of Limoges from 1876 to 1881. He was a deputy for Haute-Vienne from 1880 to 1885. He regained a senator's seat in 1886.

== Biography ==
René Pénicaud was born in Limoges, France on 1843 and died in Aureil, France on 1899 at the age of 56. He remained in office until his death.

Political offices
Preceded by -	Mayor of Limoges; 1876–1881	Succeeded by -
