= Célio Gabriel =

Brazilian footballer (born 1986)

Personal information
- Full name: Célio Gabriel de Almeida Venâncio
- Date of birth: 8 February 1986 (age 40)
- Place of birth: São Paulo, Brazil
- Height: 1.95 m (6 ft 5 in)
- Position: Goalkeeper

Team information
- Current team: Bangu

Youth career
- Corinthians
- Palmeiras
- São Paulo

Senior career*
Years	Team	Apps	(Gls)
2008	Red Bull		
2009	→ Sinop		
2010	Serra		
2011	→ Linense (loan)		
2012	Rio Branco		
2016	Bangu		
- * Club domestic league appearances and goals as of January 6, 2016

Célio Gabriel de Almeida Venâncio, or simply Célio Gabriel (born 8 February 1986), is a Brazilian footballer who plays as a goalkeeper for Bangu.
