= Felix Dahn =

German professor, author, poet, and historian (1834–1912)

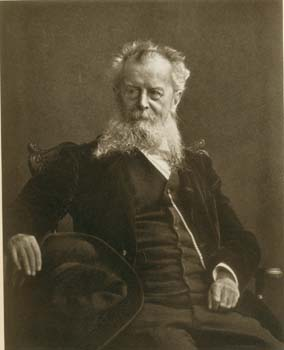
- Born: Felix Ludwig Julius Dahn; 9 February 1834; Free City of Hamburg
- Died: 3 January 1912 (aged 77); Breslau, German Empire
- Spouses: Sophie Fries (m. 1835–1898) Therese von Droste-Hülshoff (m. 1873–1912)
- Parents: Konstanze Dahn; Friedrich Dahn

Felix Ludwig Julius Dahn (9 February 1834 – 3 January 1912) was a German law professor and nationalist author, poet and historian.

== Biography ==
Felix Ludwig Julius Dahn was born in Hamburg as the oldest son of Friedrich (1811–1889) and Constanze Dahn who were notable actors at the city's theatre. The family had both German and French roots. Dahn began his studies in law and philosophy at the Ludwig-Maximilians-Universität München (he had moved there with his parents in 1834), and graduated as Doctor of Laws at the Friedrich Wilhelm University of Berlin. After his habilitation treatise, Dahn became a lecturer of German Law at the Ludwig-Maximilians-Universität München in 1857. In 1863, he became senior lecturer/associate professor at the University of Würzburg and received a professorship at the University of Königsberg in 1872.

Dahn was married to the artist Sophie Fries (1835–1898), with whom he had a son. He tutored baroness Therese von Droste-Hülshoff, a relative of the poet Annette von Droste-Hülshoff, in poetry from 1867 and entered an illicit love affair with her, which he gave a literary treatment in his Sind Götter? (1874). He divorced his wife and married Therese, against opposition from both families, in 1873.

Dahn relocated to University of Breslau in 1888, again as a full professor, and was elected rector of the university in 1895. As rector, he enforced a ban on Polish student associations.

== Works ==
Dahn's writings were influential in the conception of the European Migration Period (Völkerwanderung) in German historiography of the late 19th and early 20th centuries. His multi-volume Prehistory of the Germanic and Roman Peoples, a chronology of the Migration Period that first appeared in print in 1883, was so definitive that abbreviated versions were reprinted until the late 1970s.

From the 1860s, Dahn regularly wrote for Die Gartenlaube, Germany's most popular family magazine. His nationalist historical novels were widely received, and according to Houdsen (1997) were influential in the formation of the völkisch ideology that formed the "Germany's pre-Hitlerian intellectual background for National Socialism". His 1876 Ein Kampf um Rom according to Kipper (2002) contributed to the ethnic essentialism and opposition to ethnic miscegenation of the "völkisch avant-garde".

Dahn published numerous poems, many with a nationalist bent. His Mette von Marienburg portrays bands of "Masures and Poles" hiding in the "Podolian forest".

Besides his historical and literary production, Dahn also published a large amount of specialist legal literature, on topics such as trade law and international law.

== Bibliography ==
- 1861–1911 Die Könige der Germanen (Germanic Kings, 11 parts)
- 1865 Prokopius von Cäsarea. Ein Beitrag zur Historiographie der Völkerwanderung und des sinkenden Römertums (Procopius of Caesarea)
- 1875 König Roderich (King Roderick)
- 1876 Ein Kampf um Rom (A Struggle for Rome)
- 1877 Die Staatskunst der Frauen (Women's Statecraft)
- 1880 Odhin's Trost (Odin's Consolation)
- 1882–1901 Kleine Romane aus der Völkerwanderung (Short Novels of the Migrations, 13 parts)
- 1883 Urgeschichte der germanischen und romanischen Völker (Prehistory of the Germanic and Roman Peoples, four parts)
- 1884 Die Kreuzfahrer (The Crusaders)
- 1893 Julian der Abtrünnige (Julian the Apostate)
- 1902 Herzog Ernst von Schwaben (Duke Ernst of Swabia)

== Sources ==
- Festgabe für Felix Dahn zu seinem fünfzigjährigen Doktorjubiläum. Neudr. d. Ausg. Breslau 1905. Scientia-Verlag, Aalen 1979. ISBN 3-511-00881-6
- Kurt Frech: Felix Dahn. Die Verbreitung völkischen Gedankenguts durch den historischen Roman, in: Uwe Puschner, Walter Schmitz, Justus H. Ulbricht (Hrsg.), Handbuch zur „Völkischen Bewegung“ 1871–1918, München, New Providence, London, Paris 1996, S. 685–698. ISBN 3-598-11241-6
- Rainer Kipper: Der völkische Mythos. "Ein Kampf um Rom" von Felix Dahn. In: derselbe: Der Germanenmythos im Deutschen Kaiserreich. Formen und Funktionen historischer Selbstthematisierung. Vandenhoeck u. Ruprecht, Göttingen 2002. (= Formen der Erinnerung; 11) ISBN 3-525-35570-X
- Stefan Neuhaus: "Das Höchste ist das Volk, das Vaterland!" Felix Dahns "Ein Kampf um Rom" (1876) In: derselbe: Literatur und nationale Einheit in Deutschland. Francke, Tübingen u.a. 2002. S. 230-243. ISBN 3-7720-3330-X
- Hans Rudolf Wahl: Die Religion des deutschen Nationalismus. Eine mentalitätsgeschichtliche Studie zur Literatur des Kaiserreichs: Felix Dahn, Ernst von Wildenbruch, Walter Flex. Winter, Heidelberg 2002. (= Neue Bremer Beiträge, 12) ISBN 3-8253-1382-4
