= Aureil =

- Commune
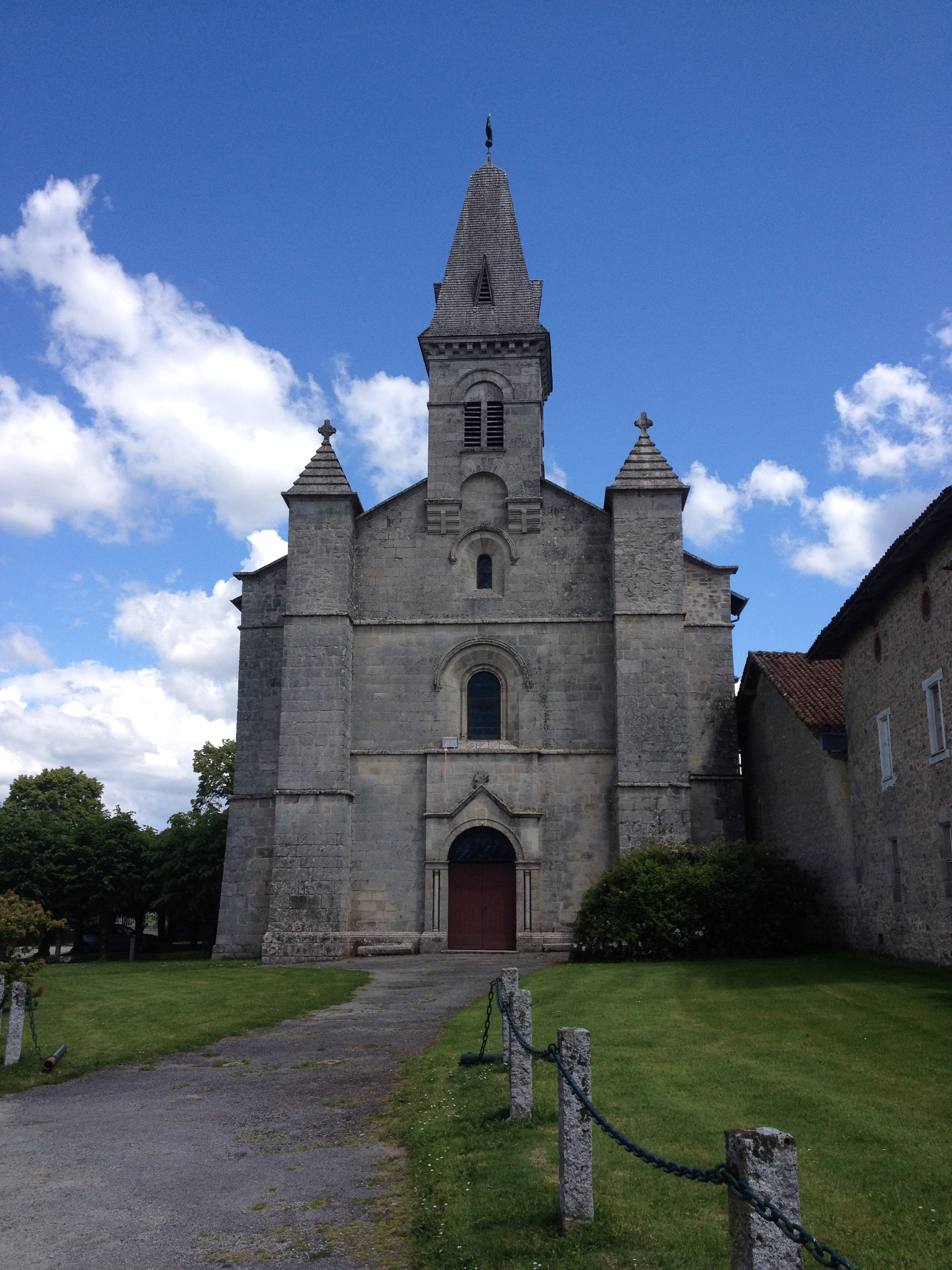
- Saint-Gaucher Church, Aureil

- Coat of arms
- Location of Aureil
- Location within France Location within Nouvelle-Aquitaine
- Coordinates: 45°48′24″N 1°23′36″E
- Country: France
- Region: Nouvelle-Aquitaine
- Department: Haute-Vienne
- Arrondissement: Limoges
- Canton: Saint-Léonard-de-Noblat
- Intercommunality: CU Limoges Métropole

Government
  - Mayor (2020–2026): Bernard Thalamy
- Area^{1}: 10.17 km^{2} (3.93 sq mi)
- Highest elevation: 481 m (1,578 ft)
- Lowest elevation: 330 m (1,080 ft)
- Population (2023): 1,045
  - Density: 102.8/km^{2} (266.1/sq mi)
- Time zone: UTC+01:00 (CET)
  - Summer (DST): UTC+02:00 (CEST)
- INSEE/Postal code: 87005 /87220
- ^{1} French Land Register data, which excludes lakes, ponds, glaciers > 1 km^{2} (0.386 sq mi or 247 acres) and river estuaries.

Aureil (French pronunciation: [oʁɛj]; Occitan: Aurèlh) is a commune in the Haute-Vienne department in the Nouvelle-Aquitaine region in western France.

== Hamlets ==
- Main village with its town hall, school and church
- Bost-Las-Mongeas: about 20 houses, mainly old, and an old chapel now part of a farm
- Couderchoux: about 6 old houses

== See also ==
- Communes of the Haute-Vienne department
