= Johann Sioly =

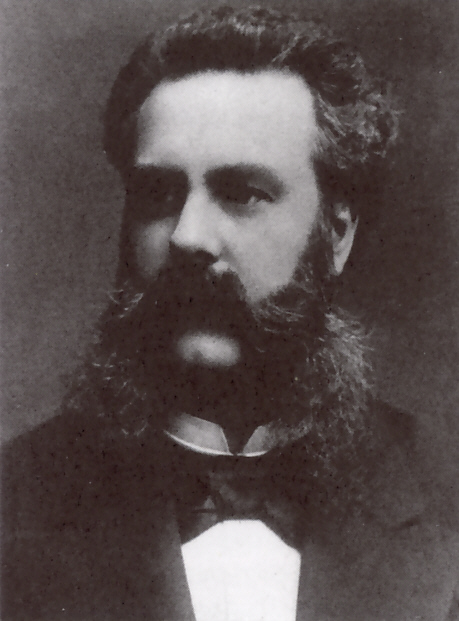
Johann Sioly

Johann Sioly (26 March 1843 – 8 April 1911) was an Austrian folksinger and Wienerlied composer.

== Life ==
Born in Vienna, Sioly studied violin from 1853 to 1859 and was a pianist and composer in various Viennese folk singing societies from 1861. Influenced by the Viennese mentality, Sioly began early on to write and compose Viennese songs. The politically critical Sioly created over a thousand songs, which were included in the Heurigen canon (for example: Des hat ka Goethe g'schrieb'n). From 1869 to 1873 he accompanied the well-known folk singer Antonie Mansfeld, with whom he also had a love affair. Before the planned wedding, however, she fell into mental confusion and died in an asylum. He also worked closely with the folk singer Edmund Guschelbauer (1839-1912) and the folk singer and playwright Wilhelm Wiesberg (1850-1896) together. Although his melodies became very successful, he earned almost nothing from them and died impoverished.

Sioly died in Vienna at age 68. He rests in a dedicated grave of the city of Vienna at the Wiener Zentralfriedhof (76A-3-44).

== Work ==
- Weil i a alter Drahrer bin (1879), text: Erich Pohlhammer
- O du Veronika, text: Carl Lorens
- I bin a echter Weana, so nach'n alten Schlag, text: Engelbert Herzog
- D' Hausherrnsöhn'ln
- Des hat ka Goethe g'schriebn
- D' Mariahilfer Schwosser, text: Wilhelm Wiesberg
- Das stammt noch von Adam und Eva her, text: Wilhelm Wiesberg
- Heut hab i schon mei Fahnl
- Die Mondscheinbrüder
- Die Deutschmeister sind da
- Die Näherin!, text: Wilhelm Wiesberg
