= Florimond Van Duyse =

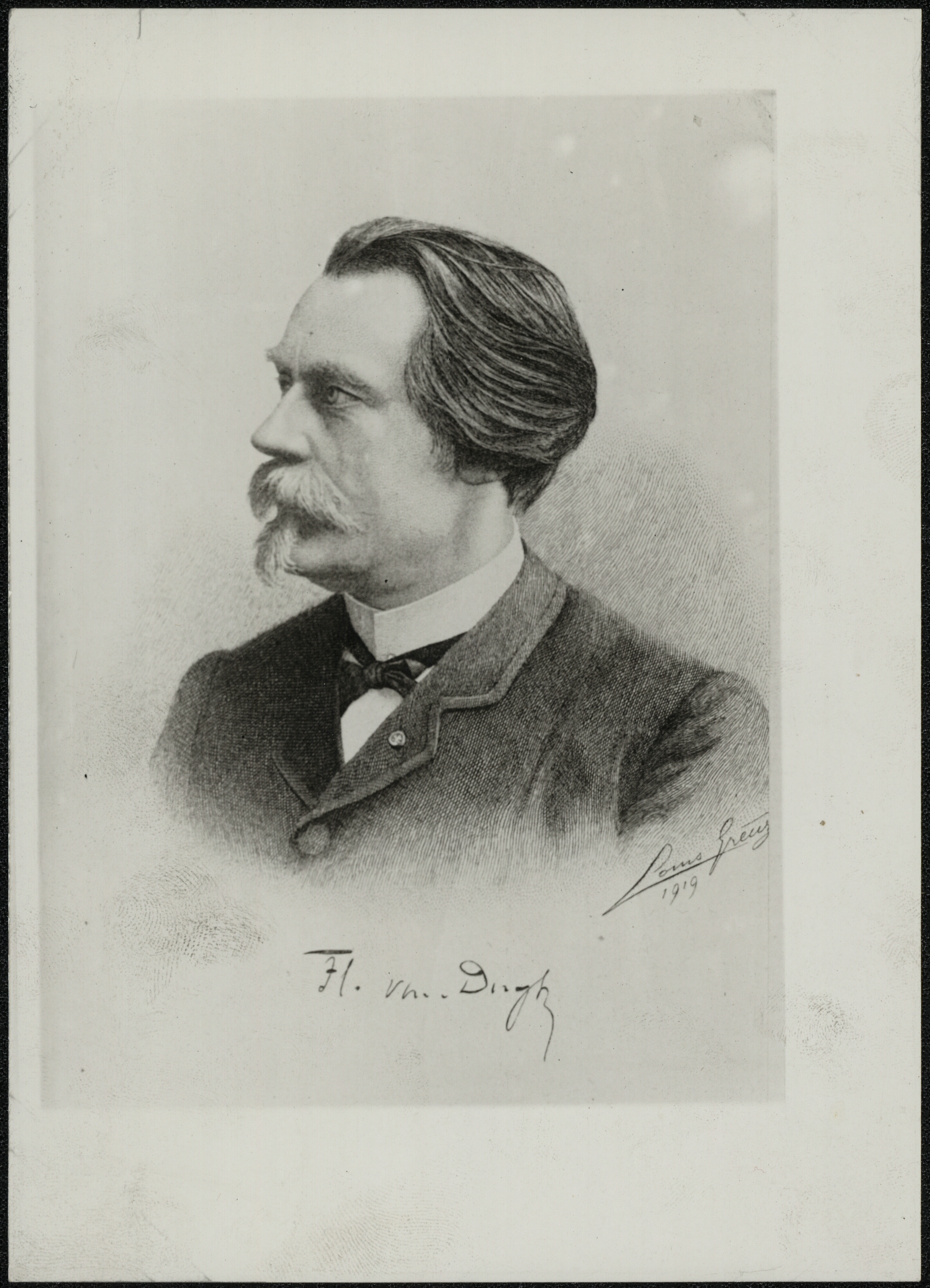
- Born: 4 August 1843; Ghent, Belgium
- Died: 18 May 1910 (aged 66); Ghent, Belgium
- Occupations: lawyer; composer; musicologist

Florimond Van Duyse (4 August 1843 – 18 May 1910) was a Belgian lawyer, composer and musicologist.

== Life ==
He was born in Ghent and went to school at Veurne, and to high school at the Atheneum in Ghent. Then he studied law at the Gentse Rijksuniversiteit, graduating as Doctor of Law in 1867. At the same time he studied music, with Karel Miry at the Ghent Conservatory, winning First Prize in Harmony (1859) and Counterpoint (1862).

In 1869 he became a counsel at the Court of Appeals in Ghent, and from 1876 on he was a prosecutor at the Military Court for Antwerp, Mons and Ghent. Here he fought for the use of the Dutch language in court proceedings, and finally made the first plea in Dutch at the Military Court in 1888.

He collected Dutch, Flemish and Walloon folk songs and published several volumes of them:

- Het eenstemmig Fransch en Nederlandsch wereldlijk lied in de Belgische gewesten (1896)
- De melodie van het Nederlandsche lied en hare rytmische vormen (1902)
- Het oude Nederlandsche lied (1903–1908)
- Het Nederlandsch liederboek (for the Willemsfonds)
- Dit is een suverlick boecksken (for the Davidsfonds)

Van Duyse died at Ghent in 1910.

== Works ==
- Teniers te Grimbergen (opera, libretto by Prudens van Duyse, his father, premiered at Ghent in 1860)
- Rosalinde (opera, libretto by Karel Versnaeyen, premiered at Antwerp in 1864)
