= Giangiacomo Moretti =

Italian painter

Giangiacomo or Gian Giacomo Moretti (1843 in Spalato – ?) was an Italian painter, mainly of genre subjects.

He resided in Milan. In 1886 at Milan, he exhibited: Rimembranze e L'arcolaio pericoloso. In 1887 at Venice, he exhibited: Studi dal vero and Fumatrice. In 1893, he was an honorary associate of the Royal Academy of Fine Arts of Milan.
