= Ferdinand Schmutzer =

Austrian photographer and engraver

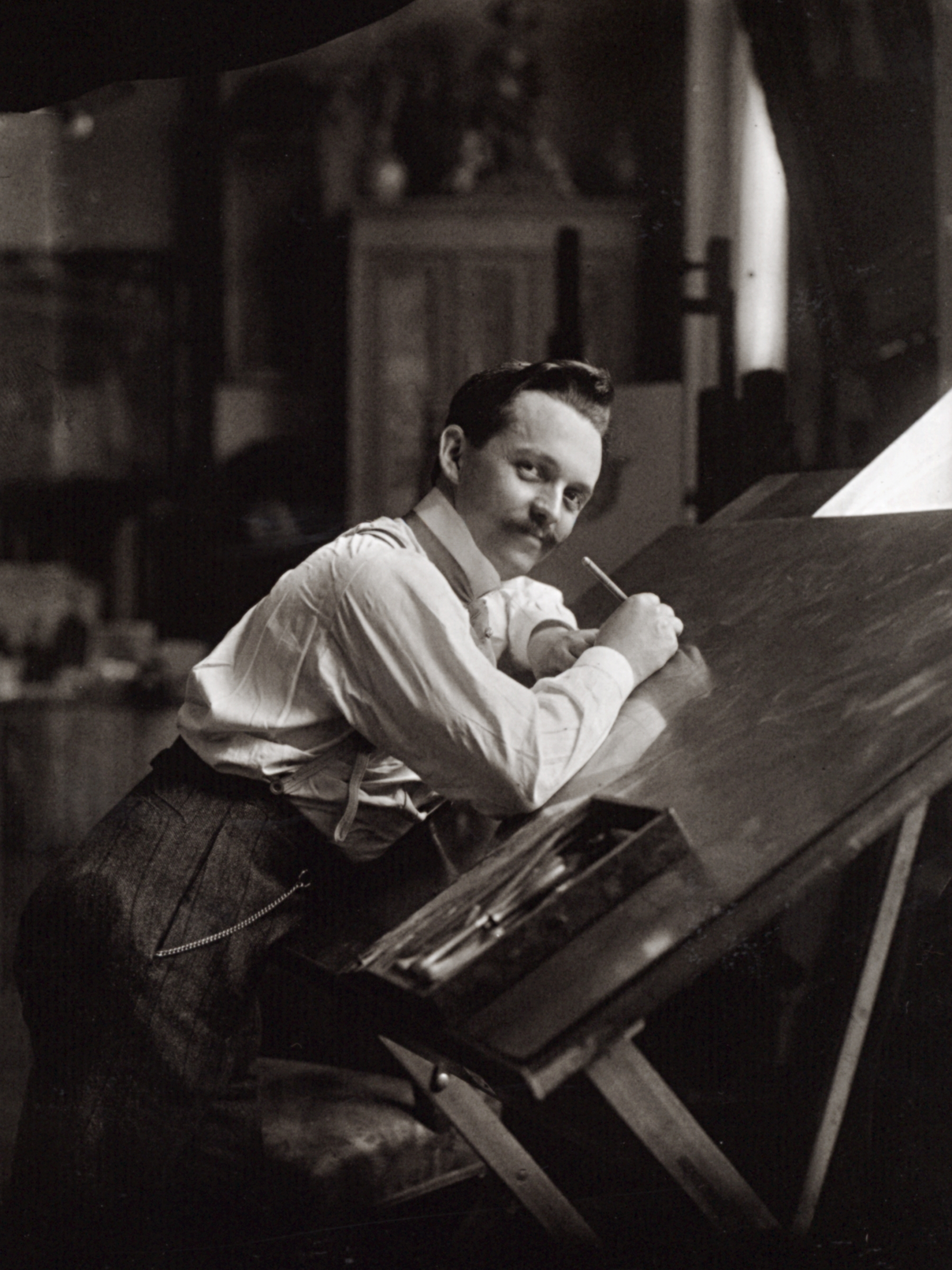
- Self portrait, c. 1910
- Born: 21 May 1870; Vienna, Austria-Hungary
- Died: 26 August 1928 (aged 58); Vienna, First Austrian Republic

Ferdinand Schmutzer (21 May 1870 – 26 October 1928) was an Austrian photographer and engraver.

His works are held in the permanent collections of many museums worldwide, including the National Museum of Western Art, the Freud Museum in London, the Minneapolis Institute of Art, the University of Michigan Museum of Art, the Detroit Institute of Arts, the Fine Arts Museums of San Francisco, the Blanton Museum of Art, the Glasgow Museums Resource Centre, the Brooklyn Museum, the Neue Galerie Graz, the Ackland Art Museum, the Seattle Art Museum, the McClung Museum of Natural History & Culture, and the British Museum.
