= Venancio Antonio Morín =

Venezuelan politician and military man

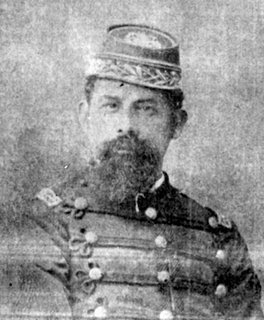
Photograph of Venancio Antonio Morin

Venancio Antonio Morín (1 April 1843 – 28 September 1919) was a Venezuelan military officer and politician. Morín supported the federalists during the Federal War and later Joaquín Crespo and yellow liberalism on several occasions, playing significant military role in the region, participating in the April Revolution, the Legalist Revolution, and quelling uprisings against Crespo. He also held several political positions, including as a member of the Guzmán Blanco state Supreme Court, civil and military chief of the Monagas district (in Guárico state), and deputy to the Constituent Assembly for Miranda state.

== Career ==
Morín was born in San Francisco Javier de Lezama, Guárico state, on 1 April 1843. He served in various political and municipal functions after elections in 1863 and 1864. During the Federal War he supported the federalist side, and in 1864 he captured General Desiderio Escobar, who was traveling through the towns of Altagracia de Orituco to overthrow the president of Guárico State, Zoilo Medrano. During the April Revolution, he assisted General Natividad Solórzano on the liberal side to penetrate the defenses of the town of Lazama up to the town square on 25 February 1870.

In 1873 he exercised the municipal jobs in Lezama in the census and statistics of the same entity, and in 1874 he was elected as alternate deputy to the legislative chamber of the Guárico state. After assuming the 1882 presidency of Guzmán Blanco state, Joaquín Crespo appointed Venancio as a member of the Supreme Court of the state, although Morín did not perform the role as he occupied himself with agricultural and livestock activities in Altagracia de Orituco. In 1883 he helped to quell an uprising by Juan Antonio Machado in eastern Guárico. He also helped to quell an uprising by Venancio Pulgar, after which he was elected as councilman of Orituco.

In 1892 Morin supported Joaquín Crespo again during the Legalist Revolution and was among the leaders of the legalist division formed in Orituco, who fought the continuists in the town square of Chaguaramas on 16 April, one day after the Combat of Jobo Mocho. After the victory of the Legalist Revolution, the president of Miranda state, Elías Rodríguez, appointed Venancio as civil and military chief of the Monagas district (Orituco). In the elections to the Constituent Assembly in May 1893, Morín was elected as deputy for the Miranda state from 1894 to 1897. He subsequently attended the constitutional congresses of 1894, 1895, 1896, 1897 and the extraordinary congress of 1894. He died in Altagracia de Orituco on 28 September 1919.
