= Chalazar =

Hun military commander

Chalazar (died June 548) was a Hun military commander in the Byzantine Empire.

== Biography ==
He served under Belisarius. Chalazar was the commander of the Byzantine garrison of Rossano together with the Thracian Gudilas.

He struck a deal with Totila, who was besieging the fortress, whereby, if they were not relieved, he would surrender on a certain day, in exchange of the garrison being allowed to depart safely. They were in desperate need, but expecting help from Belisarius. The latter and John tried in vain to directly help them, and as they were unsuccessful in this, they attempted to divert Totila's attention to other places. However, Totila continued to besiege the fortress himself and sent just a small cavalry force in response to the diversion attempts.

Thus the day they had agreed upon elapsed, and Chalazar failed to keep his promise. They surrendered to Totila, who pardoned all but Chalazar, who was mutilated and put to death.
