= Uraias =

Ostrogothic military leader

- Died: 540/541
- Relatives: nephew of Witiges
- Military career
- Allegiance: Ostrogothic Kingdom
- Rank: Dux (duke) or archon (ruler)
- Conflicts: Gothic War (535–554); Siege of Milan (538–539)

Uraias or Uraïas (Ancient Greek: Οὐραΐας; fl. 538–540 AD) was an Ostrogothic general during the Gothic War of 535–554 against the Byzantine Empire. He was a nephew of the Gothic King Witiges, and early in the war he was tasked with recapturing the Liguria region, which had been seized by the Byzantines in 538. Uraias's army was reinforced by Burgundian troops secretly sent by the Frankish King Theudebert I. In 539, following the capitulation of Mediolanum after its population had been weakened by famine, Uraias oversaw a massacre of the entire male population, the enslavement of the women, and the destruction of the city. Despite his success in reclaiming Liguria, he proved largely ineffective for the remainder of the war. After the fall of Ravenna and the capture of Witiges by the Byzantines, Uraias declined the throne, claiming that his family lacked good fortune. Instead, he proposed Ildibad as king of the Goths. In 540, Uraias was murdered on Ildibad's orders following a dispute between their wives.

== Etymology and family ==
Historians have noted that Uraias is an unusual name, leading to speculation about its origins. One possible origin is after Uriah, the prophet in Jeremiah 26, whose name is spelled Urias in some versions (Oureias in the Septuagint). An alternative proposed origin is that the continuator of the chronicle of Marcellinus gives his name as Oraio or Orai, which has been taken for Germanic. However, historian Patrick Amory considers this latter argument to be unconvincing.

Little is known of Uraias's early life. He was a nephew of King Witiges. Although probably of humble origins, he rose through the military ranks to become a dux (duke). The Byzantine Greek historian Procopius calls him an archon (ruler), which in his vocabulary means "military commander".

== Activity during the Gothic War ==
Army movements in the first phase of Gothic War campaign

The Gothic War began as part of Emperor Justinian's effort to reclaim former Western Roman lands after his success in the Vandalic War (533–534). In 535, rising tensions within the Gothic kingdom led to the murder of Queen Amalasuntha by Theodahad, which gave Justinian a pretext to intervene. He sent forces to Dalmatia and Sicily, where the Goths, weakened and facing a Frankish threat as Justinian had also secured an alliance with the Franks, struggled to resist. Sicily and south of Italian Peninsula fell to the Byzantines, with only limited Gothic opposition, which prompted the assassination of Theodahad by the men of Witiges, who became the new king. The Byzantines captured Rome on 9 December 536 and successfully defended it against a year-long siege by a numerically superior Gothic army led by Witiges. In July 538, Witiges retreated to the Gothic capital, Ravenna.

In April 538, the Byzantines landed a force of 1,000 men at Genoa and took control of the Liguria region, including Mediolanum (modern-day Milan) at the request of its population. The loss of Liguria caused concerns among the Goths, who had deposited significant parts of their wealth. Acting on the news, Witigis sent Uraias with an army to recover Mediolanum. Uraias's army was reinforced by 10,000 Burgundian troops sent by the Frankish King Theodebert. (Note: The Franks were allied with the Byzantines, but the Frankish king claimed not violating the alliance because there were no Franks assisting the Goths and the Burgundians were not under his authority.) Uraias besieged the city soon after April 538. (Note: The exact date of when the siege started is unknown. It took place approximately after the capture of Milan by the Byzantines (April 538) and before the end of the capture of Ariminum in late summer 538 because in a speech by Belisarius addressing army officers claimed that Milan was under siege.) When the city capitulated March of the following year, it was razed to the ground and Uraias presented the women of the city as payment for the services of Burgundian allies and gave the order for Goths to slaughter the whole male population (according to Procopius it was 300,000 in size) because they had requested Byzantine assistance. (Note: Historian John Bury remarked that even in Attila's campaigns, there was no act of comparable savagery. He also considers the number of slain to be an exaggeration.)

A Byzantine force remained at Dertona after the loss of Milan, preventing Uraias from relieving the besieged garrison of Fiesole in the summer of 539. After the fall of Fiesole, Witiges ordered Uraias to relieve the garrison at the besieged Auximus (modern-day Osimo), but he was again unable to leave due to a Frankish invasion. By the end of 539, he had expelled the Byzantines from Liguria and recovered it for the Ostrogothic Kingdom, which was on the verge of collapse.

In early 540, Uraias set out with 4,000 men to relieve Ravenna, which was being defended by his uncle. When his troops learned that Byzantine forces had captured strongholds in the Cottian Alps, they feared for their families and pressured Uraias to retake the strongholds before continuing toward Ravenna. Meanwhile, another Byzantine detachment advancing from the south seized hostages from among the soldiers' families, causing desertions before Uraias could recover any of the strongholds. When Witiges surrendered Ravenna to the Byzantines in May 540, Uraias was in command in Ticinum (modern-day Pavia). He was offered the kingship, but declined it. According to Procopius, he rejected the throne on the basis of Witiges's ignominious end that his family lacked "royal fortune" (tyche). He instead suggested Ildibad as king, based on Ildibad's bravery in combat and that he was a nephew of Theudis, king of the Visigoths, and Uraias expected that the latter would come to the aid of his nephew, but Theudis remained neutral throughout the war.

Shortly after acceding to the throne, Ildibad's wife convinced her husband that Uraias was plotting with the Byzantines to overthrow him. According to Procopius, the wife of Uraias wore more expensive clothes than the queen and refused to acknowledge her presence in the public baths. This was reported to the king as suspicious behaviour and Ildibad ordered Uraias's murder. Historian Herwig Wolfram suggests that this is an invention by Procopius to "personalize" the causes of political events, and that the real reason for Uraias's murder was that the Witiges clan had allied with non-Gothic barbarians, including the Rugii and probably Gepids, to conspire against Ildibad's rule. Uraias's death angered the Gothic nobility and soon Ildibad was murdered by one of his bodyguards in May 541.

== Footnotes ==
=== Primary sources ===
- Procopius (1924) [545–553 AD]. Procopius: History of the Wars, Books VI and VII. Translated by Dewing, Henry Bronson. Cambridge, MA: Harvard University Press. OCLC 491843455.

=== Secondary sources ===
- Amory, Patrick (1997). People and Identity in Ostrogothic Italy, 489–554. Cambridge: Cambridge University Press. ISBN 0-521-57151-0.
- Burns, Thomas S. (1984). A History of the Ostrogoths. Bloomington: Indiana University Press. ISBN 0-253-32831-4.
- Bury, John Bagnell (1958). History of the Later Roman Empire: From the Death of Theodosius I to the Death of Justinian. Vol. 2. Mineola, New York: Dover Publications, Inc. OCLC 1240424678.
- Evans, J. A. S. (2002). The Age of Justinian, The Circumstances of Imperial Power. London and New York: Routledge. ISBN 0-415-02209-6. OCLC 48139819.
- Heather, Peter J. (2018). Rome Resurgent: War and Empire in the Age of Justinian. New York, NY: Oxford University Press. ISBN 978-0-199-36274-5. OCLC 1007044617.
- Hughes, Ian (2009). Belisarius: The Last Roman General. Yardley, PA: Westholme Publishing. ISBN 9781594160851. OCLC 294885267.
- Syvänne, Ilkka (2021). Military History of Late Rome 518–565. Yorkshire, PA: Pen and Sword Military. ISBN 978-1-4738-9530-0.
- Wolfram, Herwig (1988). History of the Goths. Berkeley, Los Angeles, and London: University of California Press. ISBN 0-520-06983-8.
- —————— (1990). History of the Goths. Translated by Thomas J. Dunlap (New revised ed.). University of California Press. ISBN 0520069838.
