= Siege of Ravenna (539–540) =

Siege of the Ostrogothic capital by Belisarius

- Part of the Gothic War (535–554)
- First five years of Belisarius's conquest of Italy
Date	Late 539 – May 540 AD
Location	Ravenna, Italy
Result	Byzantine victory
Territorial changes	Byzantines captured Ravenna

Belligerents
Byzantine Empire	Ostrogothic Kingdom

Commanders and leaders
Belisarius; Vitalius; Magnus	Witigis (POW); Uraias

The siege of Ravenna took place in late 539 – May 540 during the Gothic War of 535 to 554 between the Byzantine forces against the besieged Ostrogoths (Goths). The capture of Ravenna concluded the first phase of the Gothic War.

Since the start of the Gothic War, Byzantine general Belisarius had conquered the southern and central Italian Peninsula, and his aim was to capture Ravenna, the capital of the Goths. After securing key strongholds, such as Auximus and Fiesole, he moved to isolate Ravenna by cutting off supplies by land and sea. Within the city, food shortages and declining morale weakened Gothic resistance under King Witigis. Despite a Frankish offer of assistance, the Goths were skeptical in view of recent Frankish betrayals and preferred to negotiate surrender. Byzantine Emperor Justinian offered a peace treaty on generous terms for the Goths, as the empire was under imminent Sasanian threat from the east. However, Belisarius refused to ratify the treaty. The Gothic aristocracy proposed in secret to make Belisarius the Western Roman emperor in exchange of their safety. He accepted these terms, except the crown, which he claimed that he would do in front of the Gothic nobles. In 540, Ravenna opened its gates to the Byzantine forces, but to the surprise of the Goths, Belisarius refused the crown and he immediately detained Witigis and claimed the Ravenna treasury on behalf of the emperor.

== Prelude ==
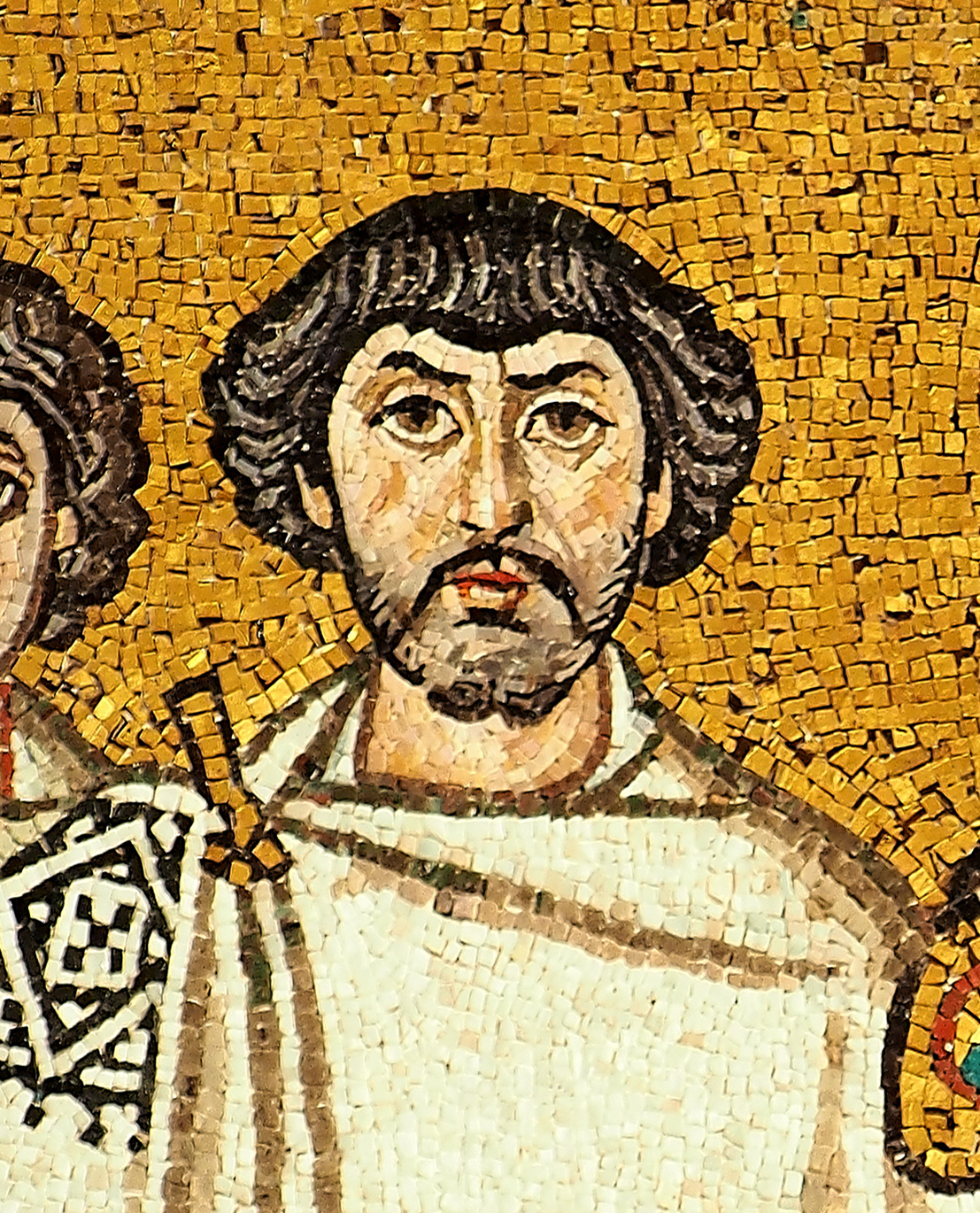
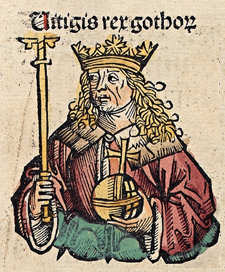
(Left) Mosaic, 6th century, depicting Belisarius, from the Basilica of San Vitale, Ravenna; (right) Witigis in the Nuremberg Chronicle, 1493

In 535, the Byzantine Emperor Justinian launched a campaign to liberate the Italian cities that were under the control of the Ostrogothic Kingdom. The Byzantine commanders Belisarius, Mundus and Constantinianus made swift gains, conquering Sicily and then southern Italian Peninsula, as well as regions of Dalmatia and Liburnia.

The Goths and their allies moved against the Byzantines in Rome with superior numbers. The resulting siege took about a year, during which the superior numbers of the Goths were insufficient to break the Byzantine defenses. Moreover, Belisarius sent a cavalry detachment under John the Sanguinary to raid the Picenum region, and this led to the capture of Ariminum. Gothic King Witigis abandoned the siege of Rome and moved to retake Ariminum, due to the town's strategic importance being a day's march (Note: The distance corresponds to approximately 50 km (31 mi).) from Ravenna, the Gothic capital. Along the way, he reinforced various Gothic outposts. In the meantime, Belisarius sent infantry troops to take up station in Ariminum and ordered John to leave the city. However, John refused to obey, and soon the Goths besieged the city, trapping him inside. At Firmum, Belisarius joined forces with Chamberlain (Cubicularius) Narses, who had arrived with reinforcements from Constantinople. At that point, the Byzantine commanders debated whether to save John. Narses appealed to Belisarius to save John, claiming that losing him and Ariminum would boost the Goths' morale. Eventually, Belisarius decided to save John.

Even with Narses's reinforcements, Belisarius wanted to avoid a battle with the numerically superior Gothic forces, and devised a plan that took into account psychological warfare aspects. He divided his forces into three detachments and advanced on Ariminum from different directions, deliberately leaving one escape route open. Additional campfires were lit to exaggerate the size of the Byzantine army. Alarmed by what they believed to be a massive force, the Goths withdrew toward Ravenna. In July 538, Belisarius entered the town. After the victory, John refused to acknowledge Belisarius and instead credited Narses, who had convinced Belisarius to intervene. From this point on, Narses and John challenged the leadership of Belisarius and started to act independently from his command. This leadership division caused delays for relief forces to arrive to Mediolanum (modern day Milan) during the Gothic siege of that city, resulting in its destruction and the massacre of its population in March 539. As a result of this setback, Narses was called back to Constantinople, while Belisarius, being the sole commander-in-chief of the Byzantine forces in Italy, prepared a campaign to capture Ravenna.

Guarding the way to Ravenna were the strongholds of Auximus and Fiesole, both having strong Goth garrisons able to harass any attempt against Ravenna. In spring 539, Belisarius prepared a force of 11,000 troops to besiege Auximus, and his army would be protected at the rear by the garrison of Ariminum. At the same time, he sent a detachment of infantry under Cyprian and Justinus to besiege Fiesole; the Byzantine forces encamped close to the city and set out to starve the Goths. He also sent Martinus and John to Dertona (modern-day Tortona) to protect the besieging forces at Fiesole from the Goths at Milan. Both strongholds capitulated due to lack of supplies after seven months.

The Byzantines were well-supplied with food and provisions coming by shipping from Sicily and Calabria, much of which was stored at Ancon. By contrast, the Gothic army at Ravenna was immobilized by supply shortages following the devastation of the lands in Picenum. Byzantine dominance at sea prevented the Goths from bringing grain via sea routes to the city.

== Military and diplomatic actions ==
=== Siege, food supplies, and the Franks ===
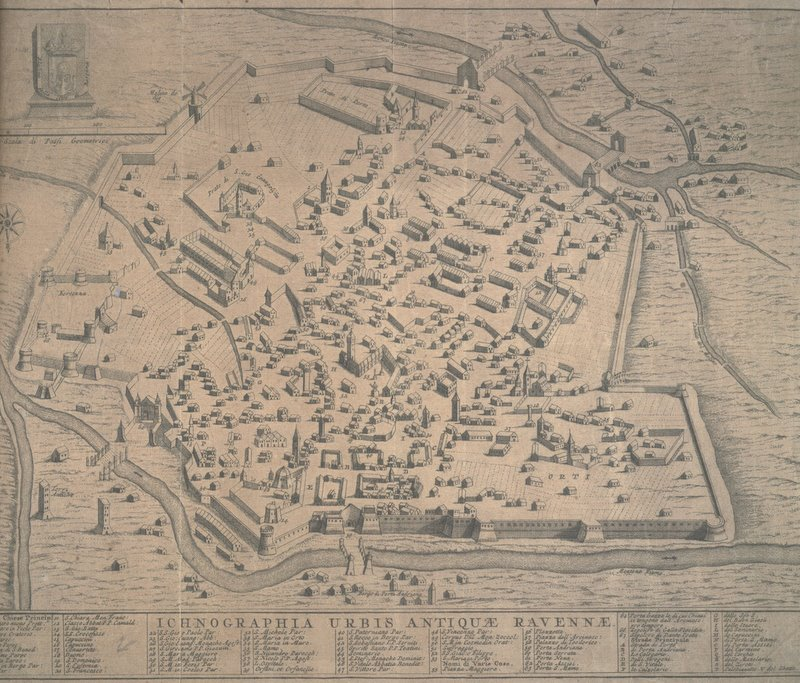
Map of Ravenna in 17th century, capturing the defensive advantages of the city

Despite the end of the campaign season, Belisarius moved swiftly to surround Ravenna in late 539 or early 540. The swift action was prompted by the need to prevent any resupply of Ravenna from the Liguria region and capture the city before the Franks could send any reinforcements. Ravenna had strong natural fortifications, making any direct assault costly. Contemporary historian Procopius of Caesarea described it as follows:

Ships cannot possibly put in [...] because the sea itself prevents them by forming shoals for not less than thirty stades (nearly five kilometres). [...] And a land army cannot approach it all; for the river Po [...] and other navigable rivers together with some marshes, encircle it on all sides. (Note: Historian Peter Heather agrees with the observations of contemporary historian Procopius of Caesarea on Ravenna's defensive advantages.)

Belisarius sent a detachment under Magnus to patrol the south bank of the Po River to prevent any supplies coming by sea. At the same time, Vitalius, coming from Dalmatia, arrived at the north bank of the Po, where they found and captured anchored grain cargo ships. For unknown reasons, the river had fallen to low levels that ships meant to supply Ravenna were unable to proceed. Once the water levels rose, Vitalius sent the cargo ships to Belisarius, who distributed the grain among his troops.

As supplies in Ravenna dwindled, Theudibert, king of the Franks, offered assistance to Witigis in exchange for a peaceful partition of Italy. The Franks bragged that they could master a 500,000-strong army (Note: Historian Ilkka Syvänne asserts that 500,000 can be considered plausible as the entire Frankish army but not as a campaign force.) and deal with any Byzantine force; however, logistically, they were unable to act. Once Belisarius learned of the Frankish envoy, he sent his own envoy that reminded Witigis of Theudibert's earlier betrayal, when his invading forces turned on Goths who had previously been their allies. (Note: Theudibert had allied with Witigis in secret even though he was already allied with the Byzantines.) Moreover, the Byzantine envoy argued that their emperor had a greater number of armies than any other adversary. Witigis and the Gothic nobility chose to open negotiations with Belisarius for surrender.

While Witigis was deliberating, Belisarius sent Vitalius to capture the settlements in Venetia. At around the same time, all the stored grain in the granaries in Ravenna was lost due to fire. Procopius provides two plausible explanations. Either citizens of Ravenna were bribed by Belisarius to start the fire, or it was arranged by Queen Matasuntha, who was unhappy being forced to marry Witigis to consolidate his power on the throne.

=== Failed relief efforts ===
Upon hearing of the state of the siege, the Gothic garrisons guarding the passes in the Cottian Alps decided to surrender. Belisarius sent a small force to accept the surrender of the Gothic garrisons and to occupy the passes. In the meantime, Uraias, nephew of Witigis and Gothic commander, marched with an army of 4,000 men to relieve Ravenna. When the Byzantines occupied the Cottian Alps, many of Uraias's soldiers had families in the region and demanded action, forcing Uraias to change course and besiege the Byzantine forces.

Another Byzantine detachment, led by Martinus and John, moved north to assist their besieged forces. Along the way, they captured many Goths, including families of Uraias's troops, which caused Uraias's army to desert. With no supplies and any future relief force, the fall of Ravenna was becoming inevitable.

=== Diplomatic deception ===
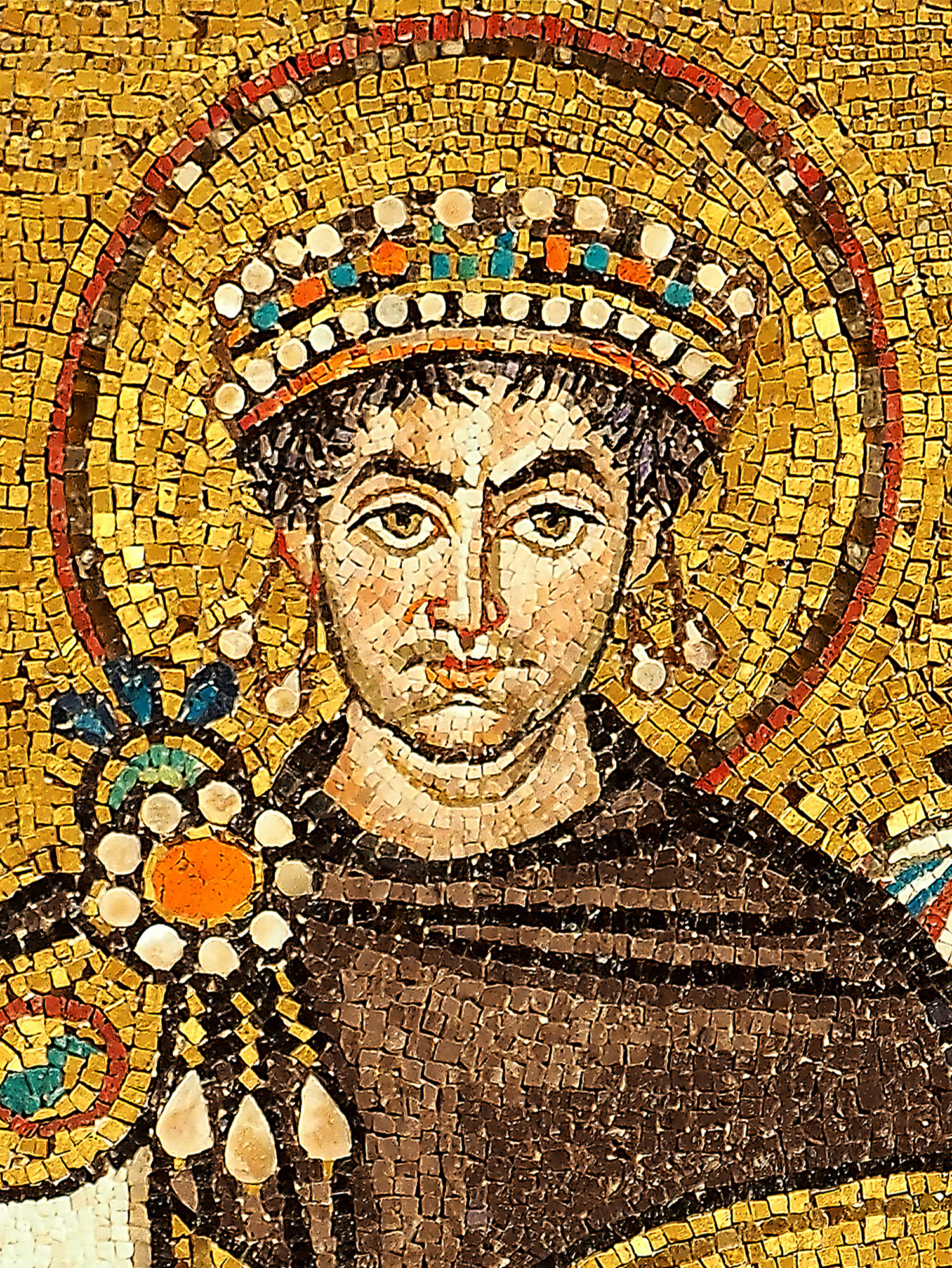
Detail of a mosaic of Justinian in the Basilica of San Vitale in Ravenna, AD 547

Justinian himself, from Constantinople, became involved in the negotiations by sending two Imperial envoys, Domnicus and Maximinus, both senators. He was eager to compromise, as the threat of a Sasanian invasion was imminent, requiring bringing Belisarius from Italy to the eastern front. He offered a modified plan, which Witigis had proposed in late 537. Justinian's plan called for a partition of Italy, in which the Goths would keep the territories north of the river Po. Additionally, the royal treasury in Ravenna would be equally divided. The plan was generous, and the Goths fully embraced it. However, Belisarius, as one of the generals in the field that had to ratify the peace treaty, refused to do so, even when such an action could be viewed as treasonous by the rest of the commanders. He gathered his officers to evaluate whether they should pursue total victory or accept the emperor's proposed treaty. The officers expressed their full support for the treaty and signed a document, at Belisarius's request, to have their support in writing. However, the refusal of Belisarius to sign the treaty gave the Goths a negative impression, and Witigis started to suspect a trap and refused to accept the treaty without Belisarius's signature.

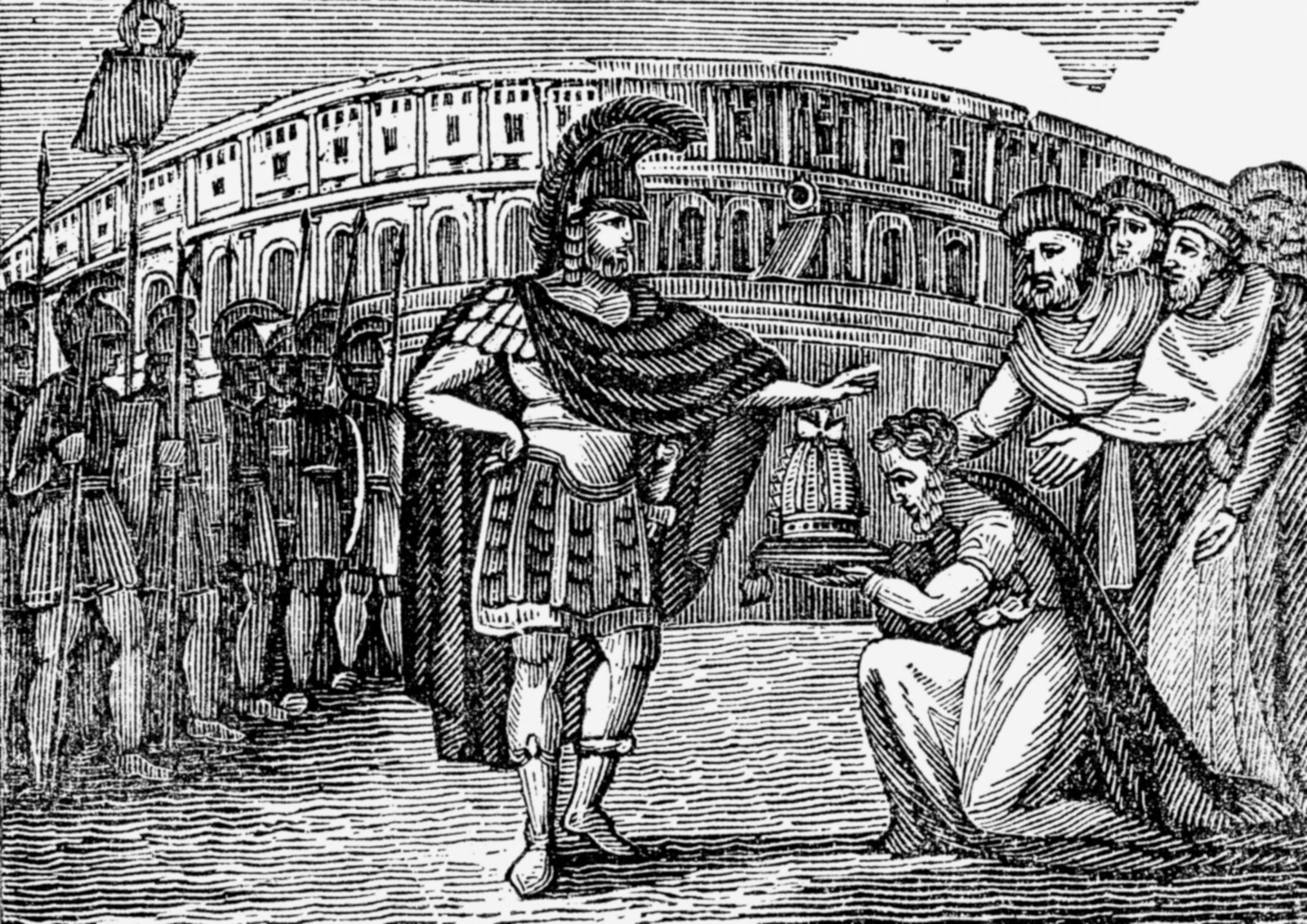
Belisarius refusing the crown of Italy offered by the Goths in 540

Around the same time, the Gothic nobility, fearful that they might be transferred to the east and never allowed to return, secretly offered to Belisarius the western imperial throne. The Goths knew that Witigis's days as king were few, while at the same time they had great admiration for the Byzantine general, both as a man and as a soldier. When Witigis found out, he provided his support and even sent a message urging him to accept the offer. Belisarius summoned a meeting his generals and the two Imperial ambassadors whom Justinian had sent for the peace negotiations. At the meeting, he asked whether they approved a course of action that did not involve further conflict, while at the same time, achieve the seizure of Ravenna and capture Witigis with all his treasure. The assembly gave their full support to Belisarius's scheme. Then, Belisarius proceeded to accept the proposal and made all pledges required of him, except one about accepting the throne, (Note: Historian Ilkka Syvänne considers that Belisarius took the oath of accepting the throne and suggests that Procopius wanted to avoid the oath-breaker depiction of Belisarius.) which he said he would make in the presence of Witigis and the Goth nobles.

Before entering Ravenna, Belisarius sent the commanders who were ill-disposed toward him (Note: These were the commanders (Bessas, John, Narses the Armenian and Aratius) that took the side of Narses after the Siege of Ariminum.) to different places away from Ravenna with excuse to secure food supplies for the army. At the same time, he sent a Byzantine fleet of cargo ships containing corn and other food supplies to the port of Classe to feed the citizens of Ravenna. In May 540, the gates of Ravenna opened, and Belisarius and his troops entered in triumph, watched by the Goths. Procopius notes that the Goths had described Byzantines as men of great size and exaggerated the size of the Byzantine army to their women, but when their women saw only a small force of ordinary men entering the city, they mocked their husbands for their cowardice. While historical witness records are not available, Belisarius refused the crown, and Witigis and his court were unable to act because by that time the Byzantine army was in control of the city.

== Aftermath ==
Upon hearing of the fall of Ravenna, the last remaining Gothic forces in the region offered their surrender to Belisarius. The town of Caesena also surrendered. Belisarius detained Witigis and other nobles of Gothic aristocracy. He also sent the Goths back to their homes, believing this would stabilize the region by dispersing them in the countryside secured by the Byzantine-controlled cities. Looting was prohibited by his troops, and Goths were allowed to keep all their private property. In mid-summer 540, Belisarius returned to Constantinople with Ravenna's treasury and Witigis as a prisoner. Later commentary by Procopius suggested that Belisarius kept a significant portion of the treasure for himself. Despite the victory over the Goths, the size of the spoils and captives, Justinian refused to give him a triumph as he did for the victory over the Vandals in Africa, presumably over allegations of treason (i.e., disobeying orders and rumors over accepting the crown) against him in the royal court.

By the end of 540, the first phase of the Gothic War was over, with most of Italy under Byzantine control. However, a plague spread through the empire, killing a third of the population, and the subsequent Persian Wars weakened Byzantine power. The premature (Note: Historian John Bury argues that Belisarius could have a complete victory over the Goths within "a few months.") departure of Belisarius and the failure of Justinian in appointing a sole commander-in-chief for his Italian forces, reignited the Gothic resistance and prolonged the Gothic War by more than a decade.

== Sources ==
=== Primary ===
- Procopius (1924) [545–553 AD]. Procopius: History of the Wars, Books VI and VII. Translated by Bronson Dewing, Henry. Cambridge, Massachusetts: Harvard University Press.

=== Secondary ===
- Amory, Patrick (2003), People and Identity in Ostrogothic Italy, 489–554, Cambridge University Press, ISBN 9780521526357
- Bury, John Bagnell (1958) [1923]. History of the Later Roman Empire: From the Death of Theodosius I to the Death of Justinian. Vol. 2. Mineola, New York: Dover Publications, Inc.
- Heather, Peter J. (2018). Rome Resurgent: War and Empire in the Age of Justinian. Oxford: Oxford University Press. ISBN 9780199362745.
- Hughes, Ian (2009). Belisarius: The Last Roman General. Yardley, PA: Westholme Publishing. ISBN 9781594160851. OCLC 294885267.
- Parnell, David A. (2015). "The social networks of Justinian's generals" (PDF). Journal of Late Antiquity. 8 (1): 114–135.
- Syvänne, Ilkka (2021). Military History of Late Rome 518–565. Yorkshire, PA: Pen and Sword Military. ISBN 978-1-4738-9530-0.
