= Siege of Rome (537–538) =

First siege of Rome during Justinian's Gothic War

- Part of the Gothic War (535–554)
- First phase of the Gothic War campaigns
Date	2 March 537 – 12 March 538 AD
Location	Rome, Italy 41.90°N 12.50°E
Result	Byzantine victory
Territorial changes	Byzantines captured and successfully defended Rome

Belligerents
Byzantine Empire	Ostrogothic Kingdom

Commanders and leaders
Belisarius	Vitiges

Strength
5,000 men; 5,600 reinforcements; unknown number of conscripts; Hunnic mercenaries	Larger force (Note: Contemporary historian and witness Procopius provided 150,000 as the size of Gothic forces. Modern historians doubt this number, providing lower estimates, but without a clear consensus: Ian Hughes considers 20,000–25,000, Leif Petersen estimates at 25,000–30,000, Roy Boss provides 40,000, and Dupuy estimates 50,000. Historians Torsten Jacobsen and Ilkka Syvänne argued that Procopius's number should not be doubted as the Gothic army was a national army in which every able male had to participate, and the peace and prosperity of the last decades had increased the population. Will Durant also used Procopius's number.)

Casualties and losses
Unknown	Unknown (Note: Procopius provided that there were 30,000 Gothic casualties in the early Gothic assaults.)

The siege of Rome took place from 2 March 537 to 12 March 538 AD and was the city's first siege during the Gothic War (535–554) between the defending Byzantine Empire's forces under the leadership of General Belisarius and a numerically superior Ostrogothic force under King Vitiges. The siege was the first major encounter between the forces of the two opponents and played a decisive role in the subsequent development of the war.

Belisarius prepared the fortification of Rome for the upcoming siege and organized the city's defense with about 5,000 troops, installed artillery on the walls, and recruited citizens to assist in manning the walls. The Goths established fortified camps around Rome and attempted to cut its water supply. They soon launched an assault against Rome on multiple fronts using siege towers, battering rams, and ladders, but the defenders repulsed the Gothic attacks.

The failure of the Gothic assault turned the siege into a prolonged struggle of attrition. Gothic forces captured the port of Portus and attempted to further isolate Rome. The food shortages and disease increasingly affected the population, who placed pressure on Belisarius to act. Byzantine reinforcements eventually reached the city, enabling Belisarius to make extensive use of cavalry, including mounted archers, in sorties against the besiegers. After an unsuccessful attempt to defeat the Goths in open battle, Belisarius largely relied on the city's fortifications, cavalry, and hit-and-run tactics to effectively besiege the besiegers. A temporary armistice gave the Byzantines time to strengthen their defenses and increase pressure against the Goths, who also had food shortages. The siege ended in March 538 after Byzantine forces under John the Sanguinary captured Ariminum (modern-day Rimini), a strategic city near the Gothic capital of Ravenna. Vitiges abandoned the siege on 12 March and withdrew north with his army to capture Ariminum.

== Background ==
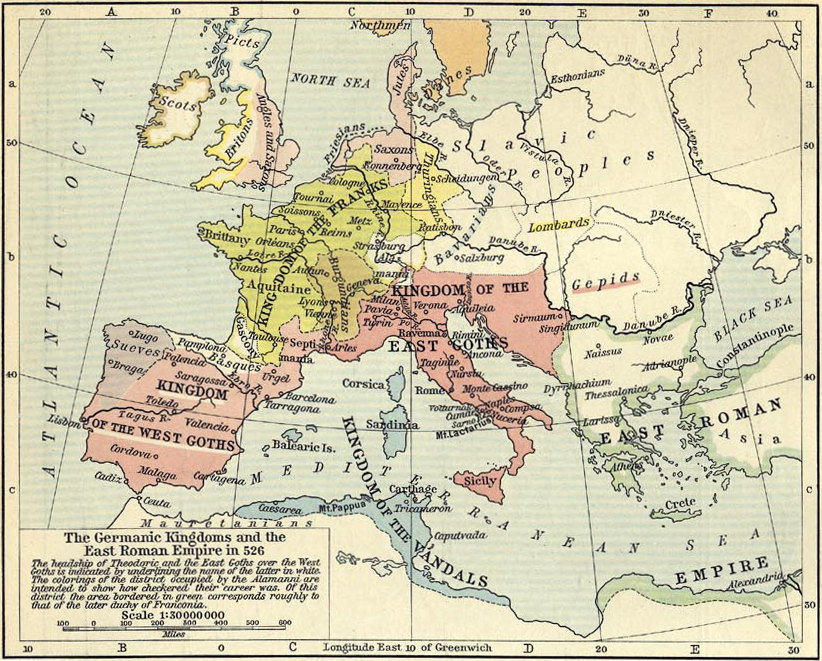
Map of the Byzantine (East Roman) Empire and the Germanic kingdoms of the western Mediterranean in 526

In the late 5th century, the Italian Peninsula came under the control of the Goths, who continued to acknowledge the Byzantine Empire's suzerainty. Theodoric the Great (r. 493–526) sought the creation of an independent kingdom by balancing the Gothic military dominance with the preservation of Byzantine civil institutions, fostering cooperation between the senatorial elite in Rome and the Gothic ruling class. After Theodoric's death in 526, his daughter, Amalasuintha, attempted to continue pro-Byzantine policies and maintain close ties with Byzantium under Emperor Justinian I. However, she kept her position as regent until her son came of age through the assassination of political opponents, and relying on Byzantine advisers, and her son had a Byzantine education. These policies alienated segments of the Gothic nobility. Following her son's death in 534, the opposition revived the question of succession, culminating in Amalasuintha's deposition and murder by Theodahad in 535. Justinian considered this a casus belli justification to intervene militarily in the Italian Peninsula; framing his campaign as both a defense of a legitimate ruler and a restoration of imperial authority, he launched a military campaign that became known as the Gothic War.

In 535, the Byzantine general Mundus invaded Dalmatia, and Belisarius, with an army of 7,500 men, captured Sicily with ease. From there, the following June, Belisarius crossed over to Italy at Rhegium. The Byzantines captured Naples after a twenty-day siege in early November, and the city was sacked due to their resistance. After the fall of Naples, the Goths, who were enraged with the inactivity of their king, Theodahad, gathered in council and elected Vitiges as their new king. Theodahad, who fled from Rome to Ravenna, was murdered by an agent of Vitiges on the way. In the meantime, Vitiges held a council at Rome, where it was decided not to seek immediate confrontation with Belisarius, but to wait until the main army, stationed in the north, was assembled. Vitiges then departed Rome for Ravenna, leaving a 4,000-strong garrison to secure the city. He also had to address a crisis of legitimacy due to the lack of royal blood, which forced Vitiges to strengthen his claim. He traveled to Ravenna and, after divorcing his wife, forced a marriage to Matasuintha, the only surviving child of Queen Amalasuintha and the granddaughter of Theodoric.

Vitiges then proceeded to negotiate with the Franks, who were in alliance with the Byzantines. Theodahad had proposed handing over the Gothic territory in Gaul, along with 2,000 pounds of gold, in return for their agreement to assist him in the war. Theodahad died before the transaction was concluded and Vitiges sought to complete this arrangement. The Frankish kings agreed but they were unwilling openly to break their alliance with the Emperor Justinian. Instead, they secretly promised to send warriors drawn from their tributary peoples to maintain plausible deniability.

The citizens of Rome, unwilling to support the risks of a siege in the light of the sack of Naples, supported the Byzantines. A delegation on behalf of Pope Silverius and eminent citizens was sent to Belisarius. The Goth garrison quickly realized that, with the population hostile, their position was untenable. On 9 December 536 AD, Belisarius entered Rome through the southern Asinarian Gate at the head of approximately 5,000 troops, (Note: Historians John S. Bury and Leif I. R. Petersen gives that Belisarius had 5,000 men, while historian Ilkka Syvänne gives 5,500 men. Specifically, Petersen argues that Belisarius did not have more than 10,000 soldiers during the siege even with the arrival of reinforcements.) while the Gothic garrison was leaving the city through the northern Flaminian Gate and headed north towards Ravenna. After 60 years, Rome was once again in the hands of the Empire. Belisarius settled in Rome, preparing for the inevitable counterstrike. He set up his headquarters on the Pincian Hill, in the north of the city, and started repairing the walls of the city. He also placed torsion ballista at towers and stone throwers (onagri) along the parapet of the wall. Grain was arriving daily from Sicily and was stored in the granaries around the city. A ditch was dug out on the outer side and a chain was drawn across the Tiber River. A number of citizens were conscripted to assist in the defense of city and the food supplies brought from Sicily were stored in granaries, which were under guard. The populace of the city was becoming increasingly aware that a siege was inevitable.

== Actions prior to the siege ==
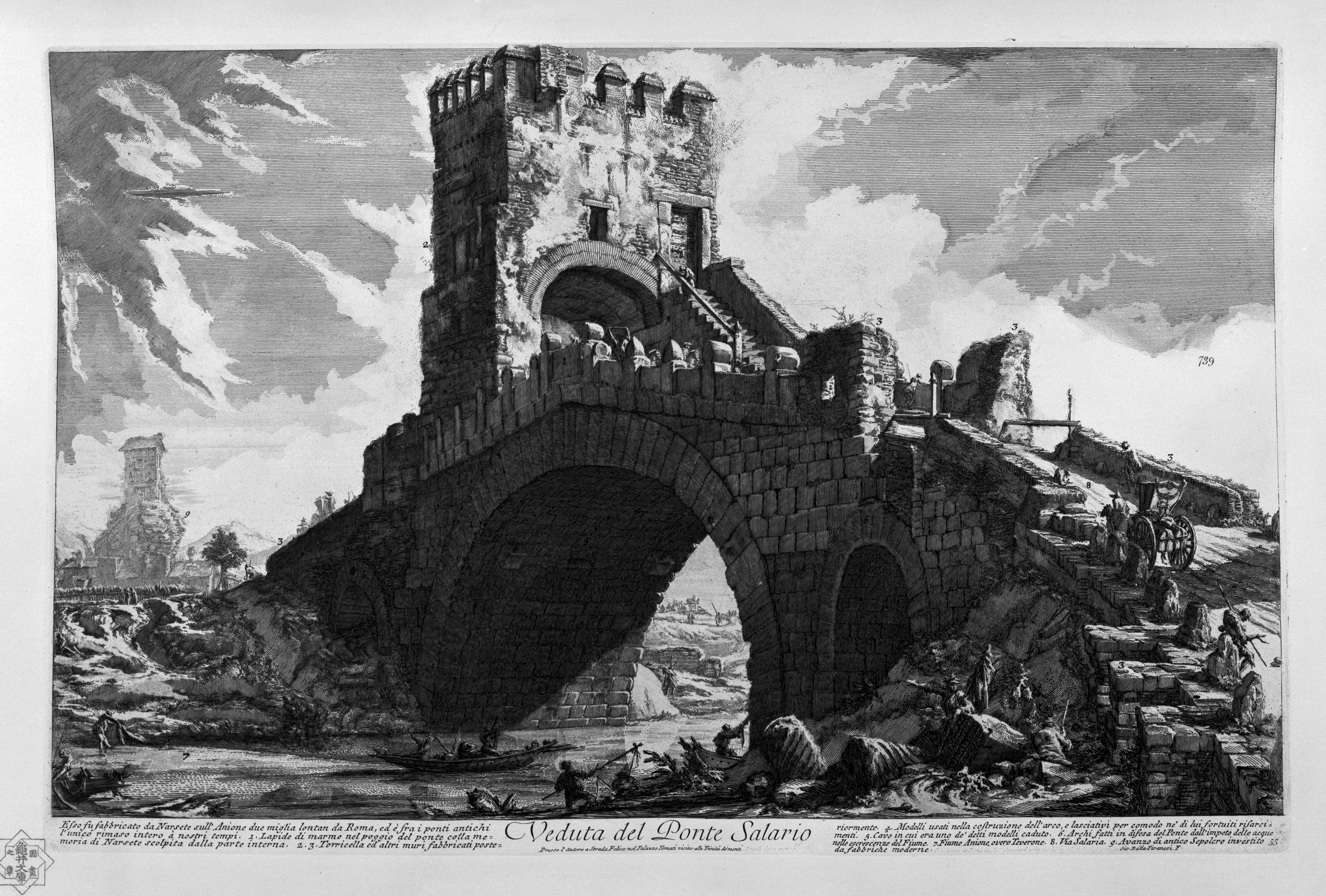
Engraving of the Ponte Salario (Salarian Bridge) by Giovanni Battista Piranesi from between 1754–1760

The Gothic army marched on Rome and gained passage over the River Anio at the Ponte Salario (Salarian Bridge), where the defending Byzantines abandoned their fortifications and fled. The next day, the Byzantines were barely saved from disaster when Belisarius, unaware of his forces' flight, proceeded towards the bridge with a detachment of his bucellarii. Finding the Goths already in possession of the fortified bridge, Belisarius and his escort became engaged in a fierce fight, and suffered casualties before extricating themselves. On the same day, Vitiges sent his commander Vacis to the Salarian Gate to remind the citizens of Rome of the treachery to the Goths for preferring the protection of the "Greeks" (i.e., Byzantines), who had not been in Italy except as "actors" and "thieving mariners". Nobody responded to his speech and the Goths started preparations for the siege the following day.

The Goths set up seven camps, overlooking the main gates and access routes to the city. Six of them were east of the river, and one on the western side, on the Campus Neronis, near the Vatican Hill. This left the southern side of the city open. They proceeded to block the aqueducts that were supplying the city with its water, necessary both for drinking and for operating the gristmills. The mills were those situated on the Janiculum, and provided most of the bread for the city. Although Belisarius was able to counter the latter problem by building floating mills on the stream of the Tiber River, the hardships for the citizenry grew daily. Perceiving this discontent, Vitiges tried to achieve the surrender of the city by promising the Byzantine army free passage, but Belisarius refused the offer, as follows:

... As for Rome, moreover, which we have captured, in holding it we hold nothing which belongs to others, but it was you who trespassed upon this city in former times, though it did not belong to you at all, and now you have given it back, however unwillingly, to its ancient possessors. And whoever of you has hopes of setting foot in Rome without a fight is mistaken in his judgment. For as long as Belisarius lives, it is impossible for him to relinquish this city.

— Procopius, The Wars Book V.xx.12–19

Rome's fortifications
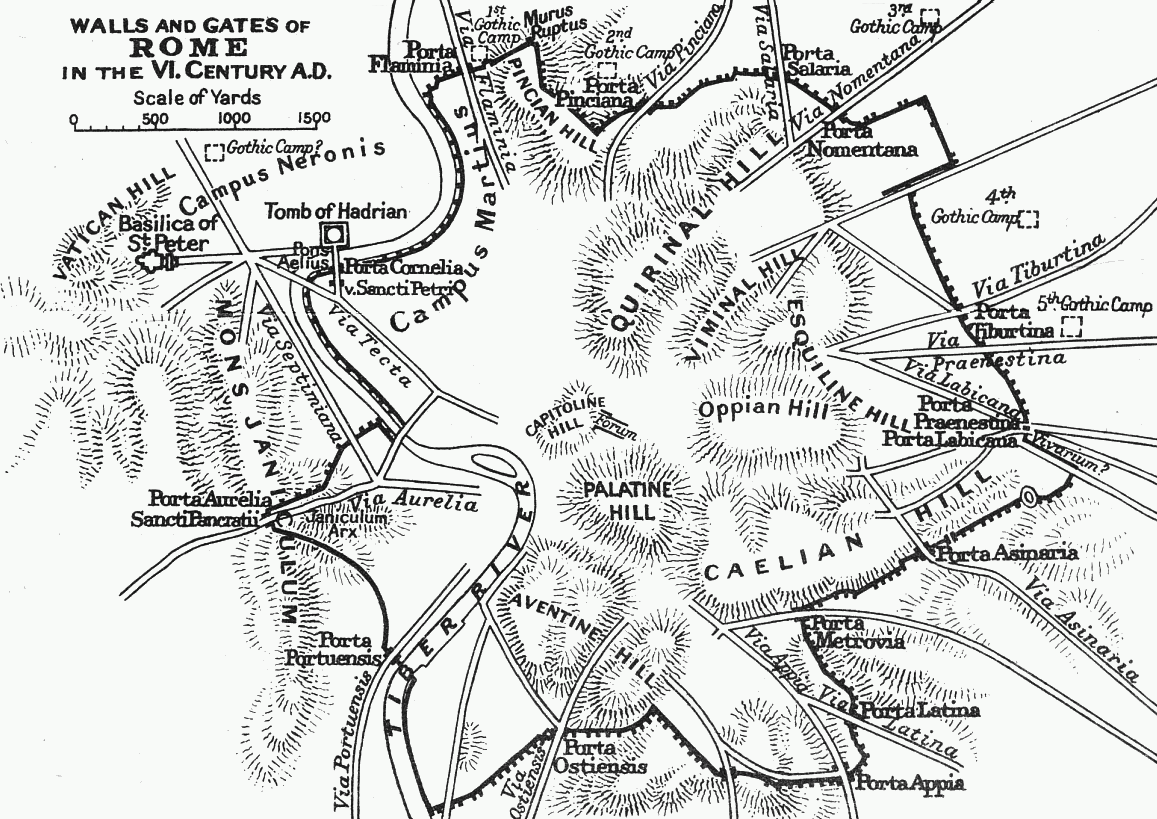
Map of Rome and the Aurelian Walls were in the 6th century with the locations of the Gothic camps also marked

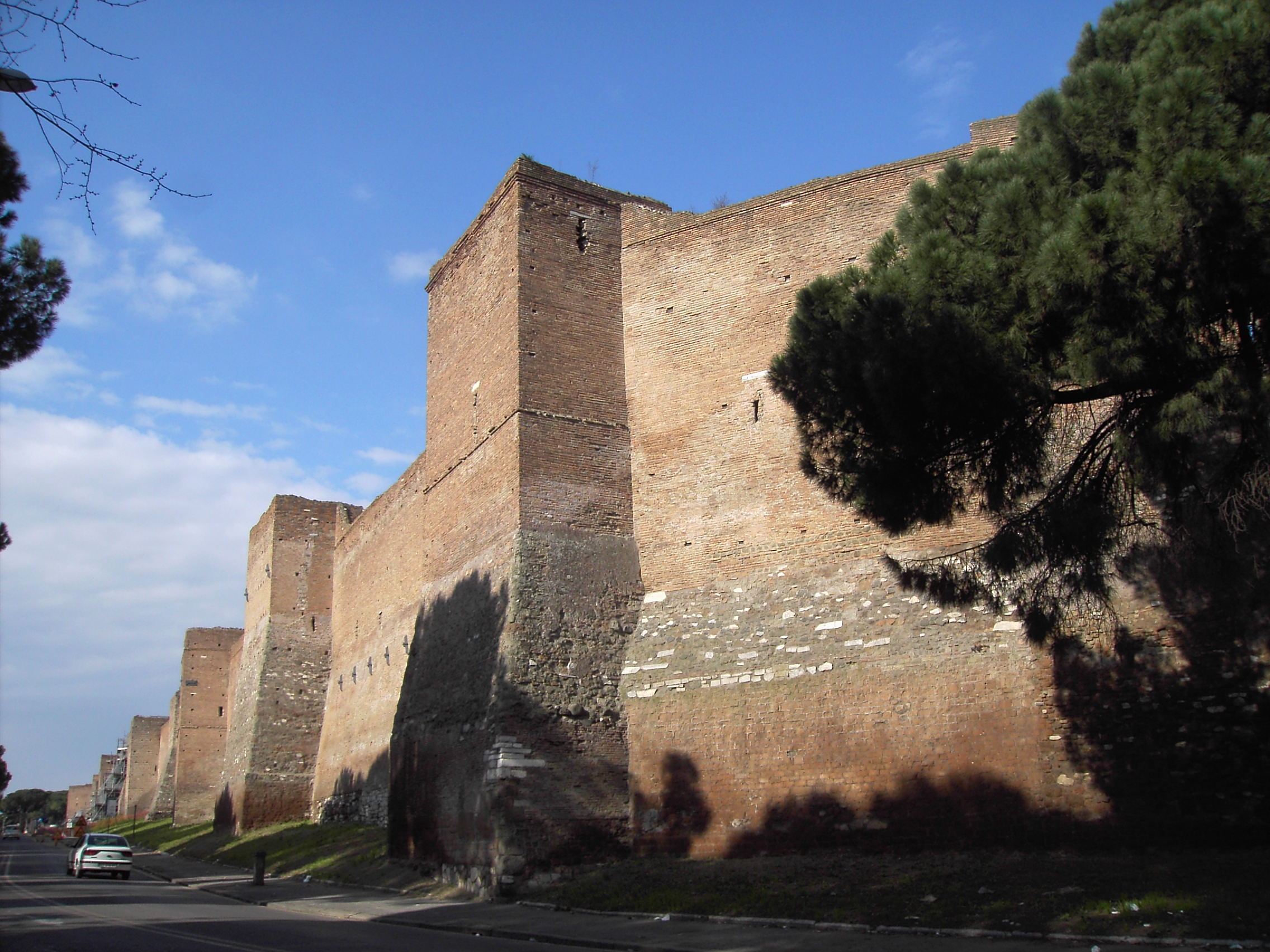
A section of the Aurelian Wall between the Porta Ardeatina and Porta San Sebastiano

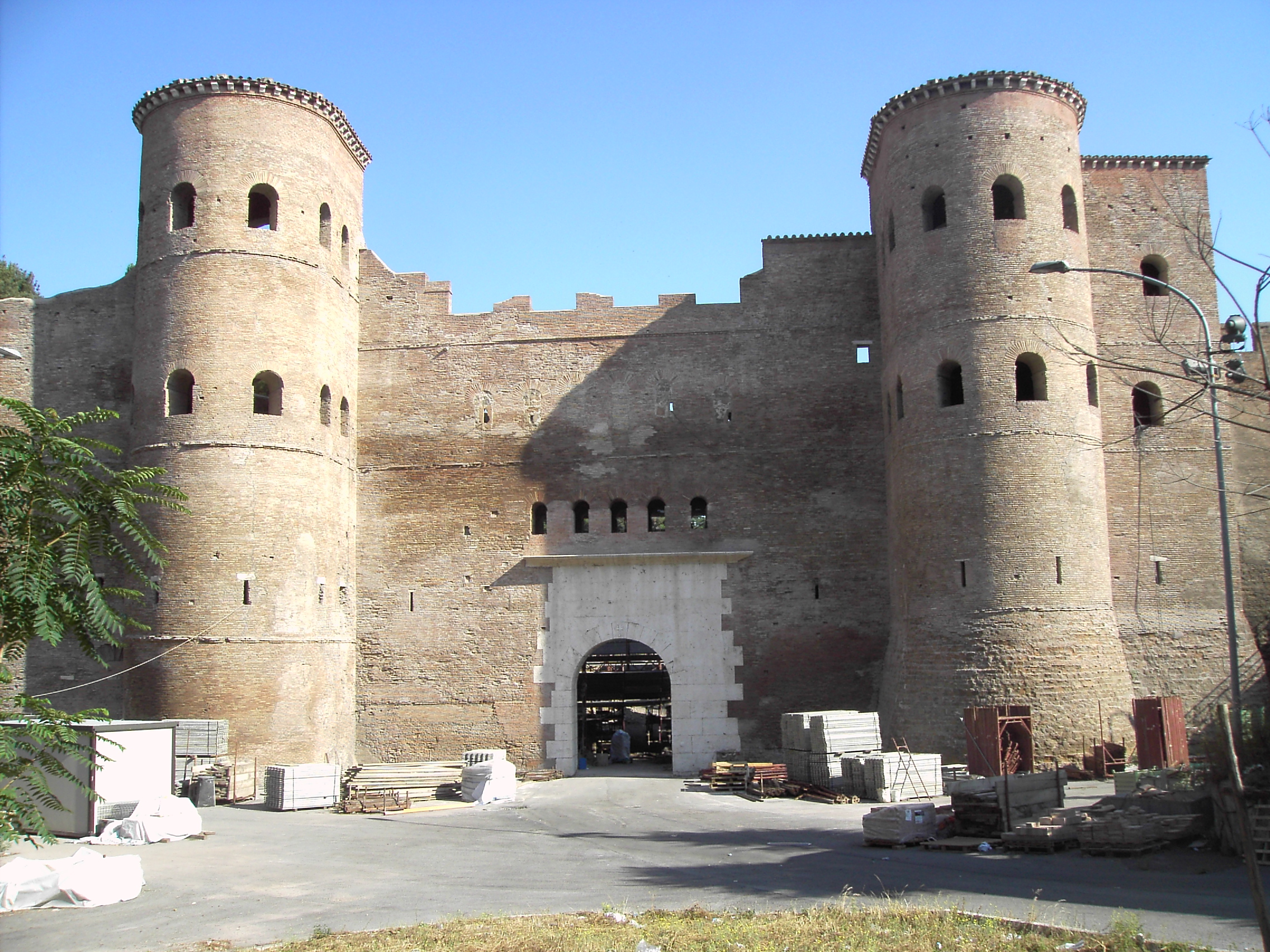
The Porta Asinaria, through which the Byzantine army entered Rome

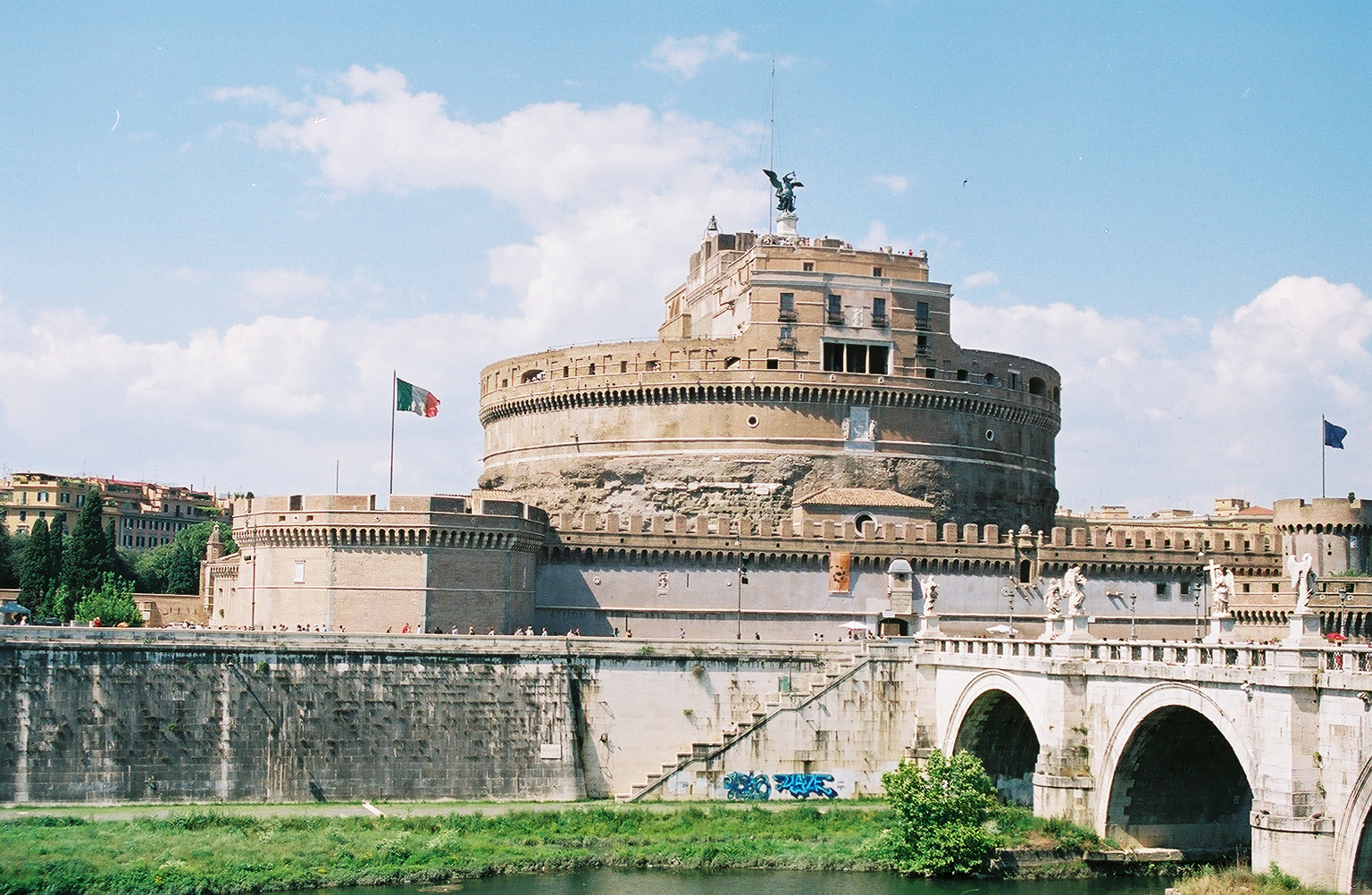
Modern day photograph of the Mausoleum of Hadrian

== Siege ==
=== First assault ===
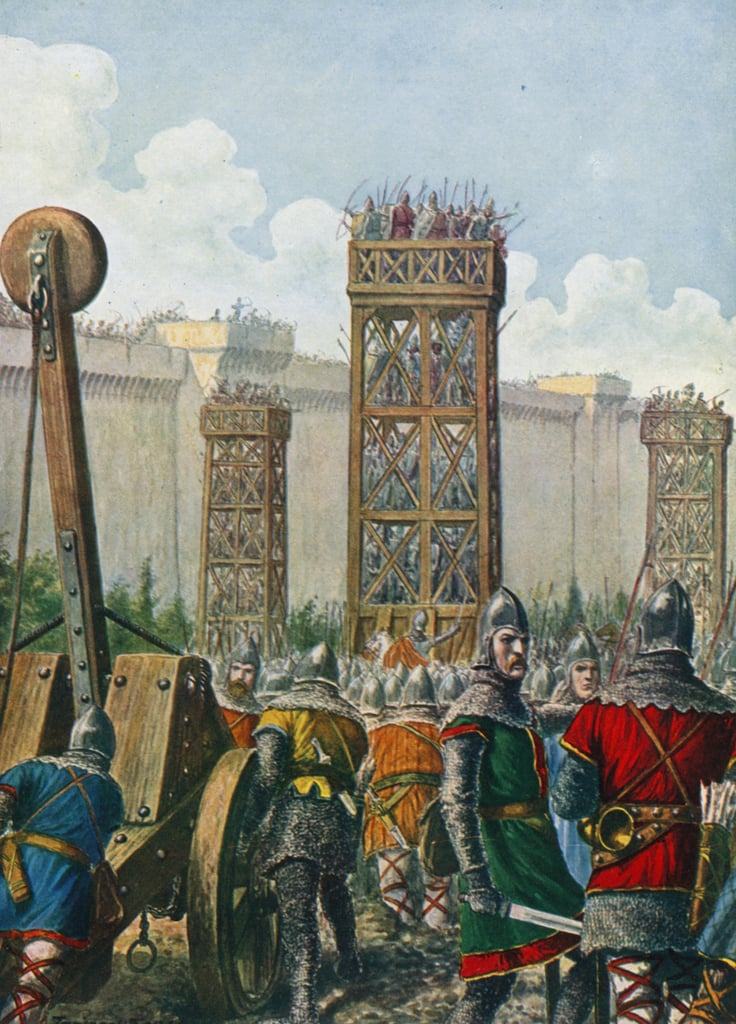
Goths assaulting the walls of Rome with their towers by Tancredi Scarpelli

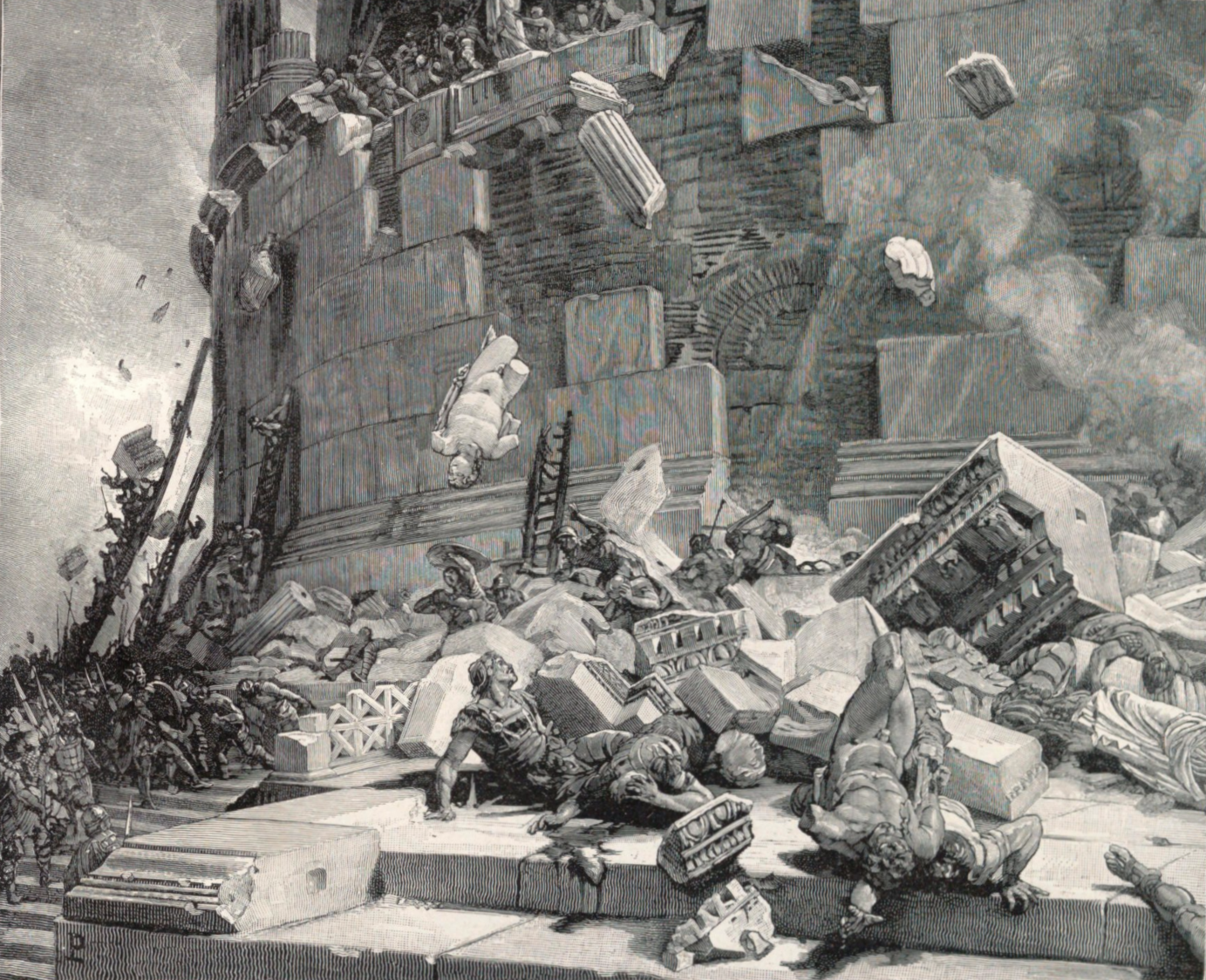
Vitiges and his men besieging Rome near the Mausoleum of Hadrian by Lodovico Pogliaghi

Shortly after the rejection of Vitiges's proposals, on 10 March, he launched an assault with his whole army on the city. His engineers had constructed a large number of ladders, four battering rams and siege towers, which now began to be moved towards the city's northern walls by teams of oxen. The Goths concentrated their forces at four points: the Salarian Gate, the Praenestine Gate and Vivarium, the Tomb of Hadrian and the intervening stretch of the Tiber wall, and the Aurelian, or Pancratian Gates.

Vitiges ordered the siege towers to advance against the Salarian Gate, where Belisarius was stationed. Their approach alarmed the populace of Rome, but Belisarius responded with laughter and ordered his troops to hold their fire. As the towers neared the moat, he killed two armored men. Then Belisarius ordered the troops to concentrate their fire on the exposed oxen drawing the towers. By allowing the animals to bring the towers within bowshot distance from the walls, Belisarius was able to immobilize the four towers; the towers were now too close to the walls to be saved by the Goths and could be burned by the defenders. The Goths' failure to anticipate this maneuver was the reason for his earlier laughter.

Vitiges then left a large force to keep the defenders occupied, and attacked the walls to the southeast, in the area of the Praenestine Gate, known as the Vivarium, where the fortifications were lower. A simultaneous attack was carried out on the western side, at the Mausoleum of Hadrian, the Cornelian Gate, and the Flaminian Gate. Lacking siege engines, they used massed archery to suppress the defenders as they advanced with ladders. At the Tomb, Goths concealed themselves beneath the colonnade leading from the church of St Peter and suddenly emerged close to the defender positions. The defenders could not effectively employ their ballistae, while their arrows were largely ineffective against the Goths' large (thureos-style) shields. Nearly surrounded and exposed to missiles from several directions, the defenders were on the verge of being overrun. As the Goths prepared to raise their ladders, the defenders broke apart the statues adorning the battlements and hurled the fragments onto the Goths below. The resulting barrage forced the Goths to retreat, allowing the defenders to counterattack with their bows and ballistae.

The situation at the Vivarium was also grave. The defenders, under the military commanders Bessas and Peranius, were being hard pressed, and sent to Belisarius for help. Belisarius arrived, accompanied by some of his bucellarii. As soon as the Goths breached the wall, he ordered an attack before they could form up. The majority of his troops sallied forth from the gate. Taking the Goths by surprise, his men pushed them back and burned the siege engines. At the same time, the Byzantines at the Salarian Gate attempted a sortie, and likewise succeeded in destroying the siege engines. The first attempt of the Goths to storm the city failed, and their army withdrew to their camps.

=== Byzantine reinforcements and Gothic blockade ===
Despite this success, Belisarius wrote a letter to Justinian, asking for additional troops and arms. Justinian had already dispatched reinforcements under the tribunes Martinus and Valerian, but they had been delayed in Greece due to bad weather. In his letter, Belisarius also added cautionary words concerning the loyalty of the populace: "And although at the present time the Romans are well disposed toward us, yet when their troubles are prolonged, they will probably not hesitate to choose the course which is better for their own interests. [...] Furthermore, the Romans will be compelled by hunger to do many things they would prefer not to do." For fear of treason, extreme measures were taken by Belisarius: Pope Silverius was deposed on suspicions of negotiating with the Goths and replaced by Vigilius, the locks and keys of the gates were changed "twice each month", the guards on gate duty regularly rotated with musicians playing on the walls at night to ensure that soldiers remained awake.

Vitiges, in the meantime, sent orders to Ravenna to kill the senators that he had held hostage there, and furthermore resolved to complete the isolation of the besieged city by cutting it off from the sea. The Goths seized the Portus Claudii at the coastal city of Ostia, which had been left unguarded by the Byzantines. Although the Byzantines retained control of Ostia itself, their supply situation worsened, as supplies had to be unloaded at the port of Antium (modern-day Anzio approximately 45 kilometres (28 mi) south of Ostia) and thence transported laboriously to Rome.

Twenty days after the Goths' capture of the Portus (April 537), the promised reinforcements of 1600 cavalry arrived and were able to enter the city. Belisarius now had at his disposal a well-trained, disciplined and mobile force, and started employing his cavalry in sallies against the Goths. Invariably, the Byzantine horsemen, Hunnic, Sclaveni and Antae origin and expert mounted-archers, would close in on the Goths, who relied primarily on close-quarters combat and lacked ranged weapons, loose arrows, and would withdraw to the walls when pursued. There, ballistas and catapults would drive the Goths back, allowing the safe return of the cavalry unit. The superior mobility and firepower of the Byzantine cavalry was utilized to great effect, causing serious losses to the Goths for minimal Byzantine casualties.

=== Open battle engagements ===
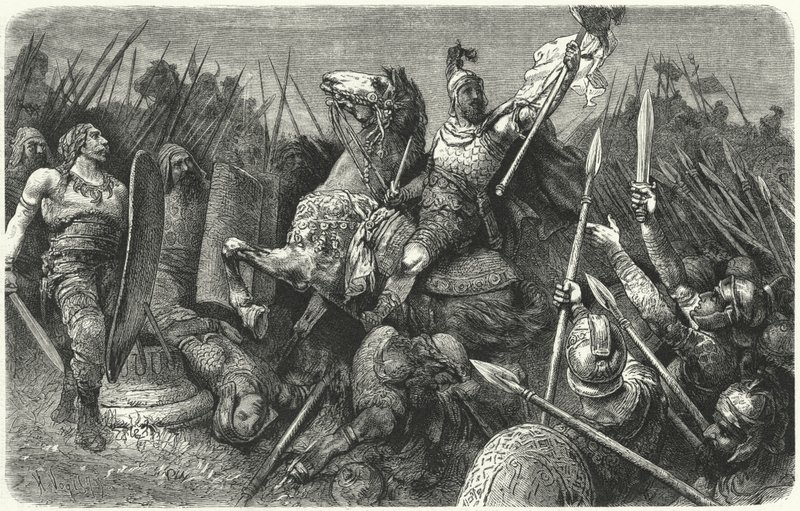
Belisarius attacking the Ostrogoths in Rome, 536, by Hermann Vogel

These successes emboldened the Byzantine army and the citizens of Rome, who now put pressure on Belisarius to march forth into an open battle. At first Belisarius refused because of the still-great numerical disparity, but under pressure he was persuaded to act, and made his preparations accordingly. The main force, under his command, would sally forth from the Pincian and the Salarian Gates in the north, while a smaller cavalry detachment under Valentinus, along with the bulk of the armed civilians, would confront the large Gothic force encamped west of the Tiber and prevent them from participating in the battle, without however engaging it in direct combat. Initially, because of the poor quality of the infantry, Belisarius wished for battle to be restricted to a cavalry fight, but was persuaded by the pleas of two of his bodyguards, Principius and Tarmutus, and positioned a large body of his infantry under them as a reserve and rally point for the cavalry.

Vitiges, for his part, deployed the majority of his army facing Belisarius's army with the infantry in the center and the cavalry on the flanks. When battle was joined, the Byzantine cavalry fired a dense mass of Gothic troops with arrows and withdrew without contact. This way they inflicted great casualties on the Goths, who were unable to adapt to these tactics, and by midday, the Byzantines seemed close to victory. On the Fields of Nero, on the other side of the Tiber, the Byzantines attempted a sudden attack on the Goths, and, due to shock and large numbers, the Goths were routed and fled to the hills for safety. But the majority of the Byzantine army there, consisted of ill-disciplined civilians, who soon lost any semblance of order, despite Valentinus' and his officers' efforts, and went about plundering the abandoned Gothic camp. This confusion gave the Goths the time to regroup, and charging once again, they drove the Byzantines back with significant losses. In the meantime, on the eastern side of the Tiber, the Byzantines had reached the Gothic camps. There, resistance was fierce, and the already small Byzantine force suffered casualties in close combat. Thus, when the Gothic cavalry in the right wing perceived their opponents' weakness, they moved against them and routed them. Soon the Byzantines were in full flight, and the infantry, which was supposed to act in exactly such a case as a defensive screen, disintegrated despite the efforts of Principius and Tarmutus and joined the flight for the safety of the walls. Despite the setback, Belisarius continued to plan and to launch attacks against the Goths, but this time he kept the infantry along with cavalry units for protection.

In June 537, Belisarius used deception to distract the Goths while the soldiers' wages were safely brought into Rome. He staged preparations for a major battle near Rome's fortifications to distract the Goths, who assembled for battle. Then he sent his cavalry to attack the Goths from the city and the Plains of Nero. The fighting was fierce, and several prominent soldiers from both sides were killed or badly wounded, but eventually the Goths retreated. Despite their losses, Belisarius secured the safe arrival of the soldiers' wages. Soon after this, the Goths started to avoid direct engagements with the Byzantines and instead focused on tightening the blockade. Belisarius continued to use hit-and-run tactics against the Goths, who were unable to counteract these tactics and instead fortified within their camps, effectively besieging the besiegers.

=== Famine, reinforcements, and armistice ===
While the Byzantine soldiers had sufficient grain, the situation for the citizens of Rome was becoming dire. Rome's aristocrats started to pressure Belisarius to fight a decisive battle, placing him in a difficult position. He rejected their demands, arguing that he would not endanger the emperor's cause or the population through reckless action. Belisarius also noted that relying on civilian support was risky, especially since he expected reinforcements from the emperor's army and fleet to arrive within days. Belisarius feared that citizens of Rome would betray them by giving the city to the Goths. The successes in the hit-and-run tactics enabled him to distribute grain to the citizens of Rome. He also sent Procopius and later Antonina (Belisarius's wife) to assemble troops from the various garrisons in the south and to inquire the status of incoming reinforcements. Procopius assembled 500 soldiers, while 3,000 Isaurians under Paulus and Conon disembarked at Naples and 1,800 cavalry under John the Sanguinary landed at Dyrrachium. The inhabitants of the Calabria region gave John wagons filled with grain. The reinforcements met with Procopius, and from there the Isaurians sailed to Ostia while the rest took the coastal road to Rome. Upon this news, Belisarius launched another successful diversion to keep the Goths occupied to ensure safe passage for the supply wagons to arrive in Rome.

Envoys: [...] we give up to you Sicily, great as it is and of such wealth, seeing that without it you cannot possess Libya in security.

Belisarius: And we on our side permit the Goths to have the whole of Britain, which is much larger than Sicily and was subject to the Romans in early times. For it is only fair to make an equal return to those who first do a good deed or perform a kindness.

Envoys: Well, then, if we should make you a proposal concerning Campania also, or about Naples itself, will you listen to it?

Belisarius: No, for we are not empowered to administer the emperor's affairs in a way which is not in accord with his wish.

— Dialogue between Belisarius and the Gothic embassy
Procopius, Wars VI.vi.27–34

The Goths, also suffering from disease and famine, now resorted to diplomacy. An embassy of three envoys was sent by Vitiges to Belisarius. The envoys offered to surrender Sicily and southern Italy (which were already in Byzantine hands) in exchange for a Byzantine withdrawal. The dialogue, as preserved by Procopius, illustrates the reversed situation of the two parties. The envoys claimed to have suffered injustice and offered territories, and Belisarius, secured in his position, was dismissive of the Goths' claims. Nevertheless, in mid-December, a three-month armistice was arranged so that Gothic envoys could travel to Constantinople for negotiations. Belisarius took advantage of it and brought the 3,000 Isaurians, who had landed at Ostia, along with a large amount of supplies that had accumulated during the blockade, safely to Rome. During the armistice, the Goths' situation deteriorated, and they were in need of supplies; they were forced to abandon the Portus, which was promptly occupied by an Isaurian garrison, as well as the city of Centumcellae (modern Civitavecchia) and Albano. Thus, by the end of December, the Goths were virtually surrounded by Byzantine detachments, and their supply routes effectively cut. The Goths protested these actions, but to no avail. Belisarius sent John with 2,000 men to the Picenum region, with orders to avoid conflict but, when ordered to move, to capture or plunder any stronghold he met, and not to leave any enemy strongholds in his rear.

=== Armistice breached and the capture of Ariminum ===
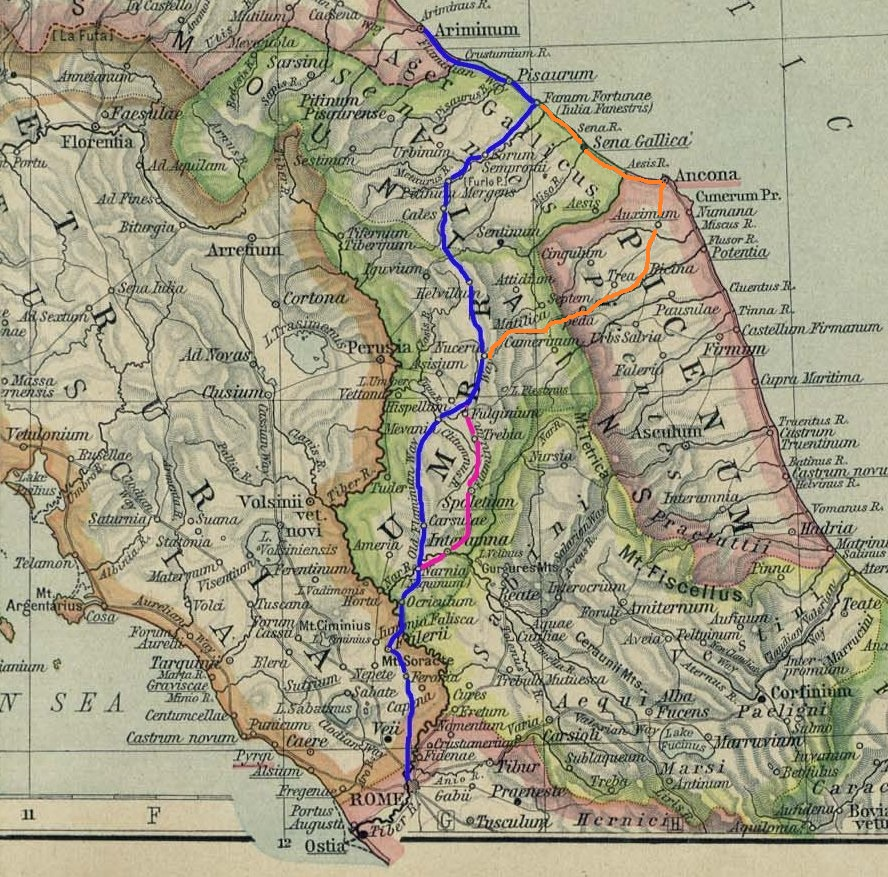
Route of the Via Flaminia; the purple route indicates the Via Flaminia Nova. The orange route indicates the variant that crosses the central part of Marche and reaches the Adriatic Sea in Ancona.

The Goths, angered by the expansion of Byzantines in capturing strategic positions during the armistice, attempted to enter the city in secret. First they tried to enter through the Aqua Virgo aqueduct. However, the torches they used were detected by a guard on the nearby Pincian Gate. The aqueduct was put under close guard, and, recognizing this, the Goths made no further attempt to use it. Then, they attempted a sudden attack against the same gate at lunchtime, but they were repulsed by the guards under the command of Ildiger, Antonina's son-in-law. The Goths then bribed two citizens of Rome to drug the guards at a section of the walls near St Peter's and enter the city unopposed, but one of them revealed the plan to Belisarius, thwarting another attempt to breach Rome.

After the three attempts by the Goths to enter the city, Belisarius sent letters to John to start raiding the Picenum region. John defeated a Gothic force under Ulithus, an uncle of Vitiges, and then he was free to raid the province without any resistance. However, he disobeyed Belisarius' instructions, and did not attempt to take the fortified towns of Auxinum (modern-day Osimo) and Urbinum (modern-day Urbino), judging that they were too strong. Instead, he bypassed them and headed for Ariminum (modern-day Rimini), invited there by the local population. The capture of Ariminum meant that the Byzantines had a stronghold a day's march away from the Gothic capital, Ravenna. Upon the news of Ariminum's fall, Vitiges decided to withdraw towards his capital, lifting the year-long siege of Rome. In mid-March, the Goths burned their camps and abandoned Rome, marching northeast along the Via Flaminia. Belisarius led out his forces and waited until half the Gothic army had crossed the Milvian Bridge before attacking the remaining Goths, who broke and many were slain or drowned in the river.

== Aftermath ==
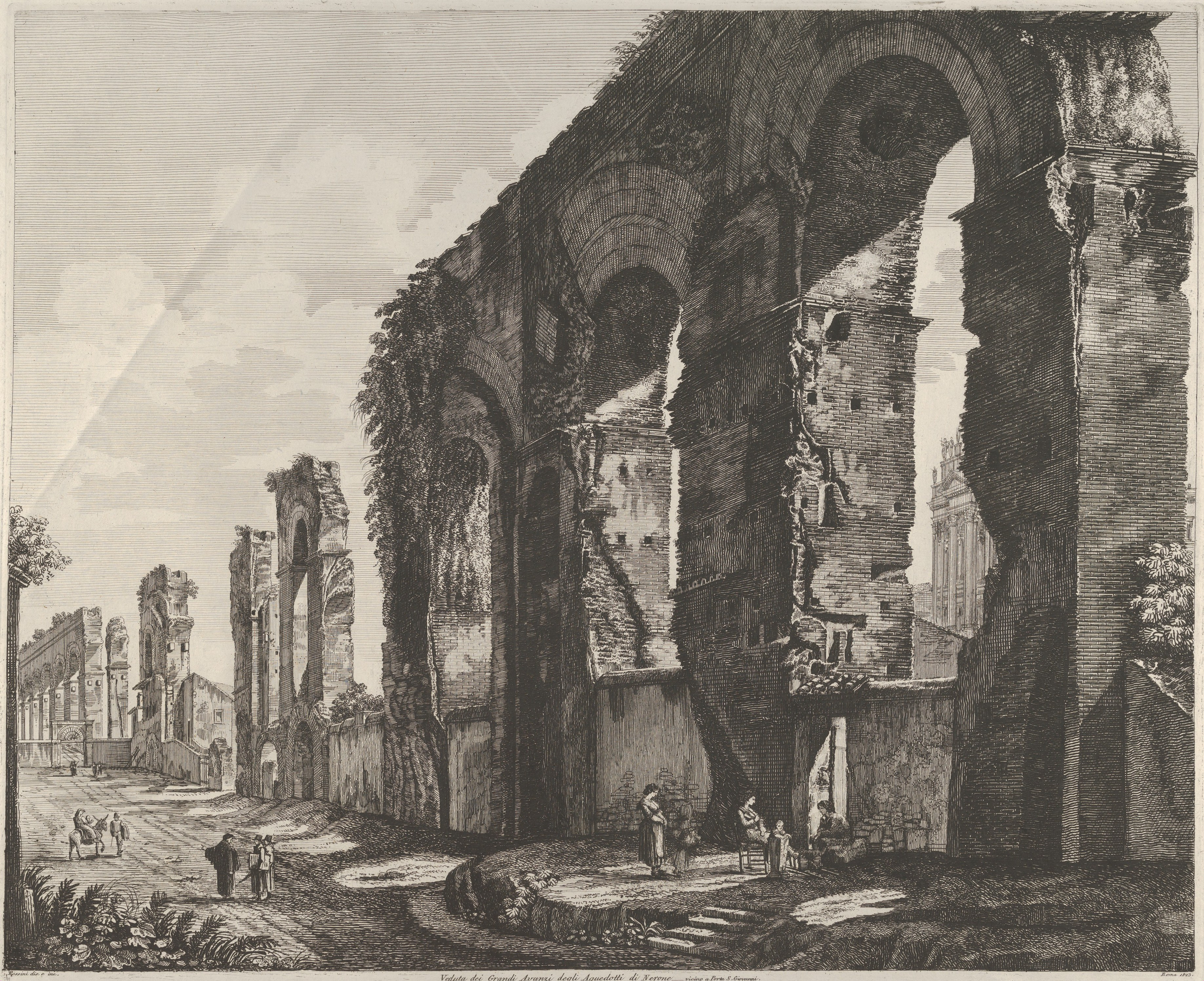
One of Rome's aqueducts in ruins

As the Goths were retreating toward their capital, Belisarius sent infantry forces to replace John's cavalry at Ariminum. However, John refused to obey. Soon the Goths besieged Ariminum and trapped John inside the town. Belisarius joined forces with Chamberlain Narses, who had arrived with reinforcements from Constantinople. John's insubordination divided the Byzantine leadership into two factions: Belisarius and his supporters on one side, and Narses, who supported John, on the other. Belisarius was convinced by Narses to rescue John despite his insubordination.

Even with the reinforcements, Belisarius wanted to avoid a battle with the numerically superior Gothic forces, and devised a plan incorporating psychological warfare tactics to deceive the Goths into believing that a larger force was arriving. Belisarius's plan succeeded in having the Goths lift the siege and withdraw to Ravenna. After the victory, John refused to acknowledge Belisarius and instead credited Narses, who had convinced Belisarius to intervene. From this point on, Narses and John challenged Belisarius's leadership and began to act independently of his command. Poor coordination led to the loss of the major city of Mediolanum (modern-day Milan) to the Goths in early 539. In response to this setback, Justinian called Narses back to Constantinople, leaving Belisarius as the sole commander-in-chief of the Byzantine forces in Italy.

Belisarius proceeded to secure strongholds in the region surrounding Ravenna and eventually he besieged Ravenna, aiming to starve the garrison since the city had strong defensive advantages. Additionally he employed a stratagem to make the Goths open the gates, thinking that he would become the Western Roman Emperor. At the last moment, Belisarius refused the crown, but by then the Byzantine troops were in control of the city and captured the Gothic king. The fall of Ravenna concluded the first phase of the Gothic War, with most of Italy under Byzantine control. The stratagem spooked Justinian, and Belisarius's rivals in the royal court accused him of usurpation. Although Belisarius returned to Constantinople in mid-summer 540 with Ravenna's treasury and the defeated Gothic King Vitiges as a prisoner, Justinian refused him a triumph. The general's departure from Italy had been required so he could serve on the eastern front against the Persians in the upcoming Lazic War (541–562), which ended as a stalemate.

The departure of Belisarius and the failure of Justinian to appoint a sole commander-in-chief of Byzantine forces in Italy reignited the Gothic resistance and prolonged the Gothic War by more than a decade. The new Gothic king Totila managed to reverse the situation nearly bringing the Empire's position in Italy to an almost collapsed state. Rome was besieged twice by Totila, in 546 and in 549–550, both of which had a disastrous effect on the population of the city. By one estimate, the population declined by 90% to around 30,000 by the year 550. Of the original 13 aqueducts only two remained functional, and the populated area was 10% of that at its peak.

== Sources ==
=== Primary ===
- Procopius (1919) [545–553 AD]. Procopius: History of the Wars, Books V and VI. Translated by Dewing, Henry Bronson. Cambridge, MA: Harvard University Press. OCLC 1454934700.

=== Secondary ===
- Boss, Roy (1993). Justinian's Wars, Belisarius, Narses and the Reconquest of the West. Montvert. ISBN 9781874101017.
- Bury, John Bagnell (1958). History of the Later Roman Empire Vol. II. Dover Publications.
- Dupuy, Richard Ernest; Dupuy, Trevor Nevitt (2007) [1970]. The Collins Encyclopedia of Military History, From 3500 BC to the Present (4th ed.). Glasgow: Book Club Associates in association with HarperCollins Publishers. OCLC 28765642.
- Durant, William (1950). The Story of Civilization. Vol. IV. The Age of Faith: The Story of Civilization. New York: Simon and Schuster. OCLC 731309107.
- Evans, J. A. S. (2002). The Age of Justinian, The Circumstances of Imperial Power. London and New York: Routledge. ISBN 0-415-02209-6. OCLC 48139819.
- Heather, Peter J. (2018). Rome Resurgent: War and Empire in the Age of Justinian. New York, NY: Oxford University Press. ISBN 978-0-199-36274-5. OCLC 1007044617.
- Hughes, Ian (2009). Belisarius: The Last Roman General. Yardley, PA: Westholme Publishing, LLC. ISBN 978-1-59416-528-3.
- Jacobsen, Torsten C. (2009). The Gothic War, Rome's Final Conflict with the West. Yardley, PA: Westholme. ISBN 978-1-59416-084-4.
- Kovács, Tamás (2019). "Procopius's Sibyl – The Fall of Vitigis and the Ostrogoths" (PDF). Graeco-Latina Brunensia. 24 (2): 113–124. doi:10.5817/GLB2019-2-8.
- Lillington-Martin, Christopher (2013). "Procopius on the struggle for Dara and Rome". In Sarantis, A.; Christie, N. (eds.). War and Warfare in Late Antiquity: Current Perspectives. Late Antique Archaeology. Vol. 8. Leiden: Brill. pp. 599–630. doi:10.1163/22134522-90000019a.
- Parnell, David Alan (2015). "The social networks of Justinian's generals" (PDF). Journal of Late Antiquity. 8 (1): 114–135. doi:10.1353/jla.2015.0009.
- Petersen, Leif Inge Ree (2013). Siege Warfare and Military Organization in the Successor States (400–800 AD): Byzantium, the West and Islam. Brill. ISBN 978-90-04-25446-6.
- Shepherd, William R. (1911). Historical Atlas. Austin, TX: The University of Texas at Austin. OCLC 1069319714.
- Syvänne, Ilkka (2021). Military History of Late Rome 518–565. Yorkshire, PA: Pen and Sword Military. ISBN 978-1-4738-9530-0.
- Twine, Kevin (1992). "The City in Decline: Rome in Late Antiquity" (PDF). Middle States Geographer. 25: 134–138. S2CID 130565899.
- Wolfram, Herwig (1988). History of the Goths. Berkeley, Los Angeles and London: University of California Press. ISBN 0-520-06983-8.
