= Siege of Milan (538–539) =

Siege during Justinian's Gothic War

- Part of the Gothic War (535–554)
- First five years of Belisarius's campaigns in Italy
Date	Soon after April 538 (Note: The exact date of when the siege started is unknown. It probably took place after the capture of Milan by the Byzantines (April 538) and before the end of the capture of Ariminum in late summer 538 because in a speech by Belisarius addressing army officers claimed that Milan was under siege.) – March 539 AD
Location	Milan, Italy
Result	Ostrogoth victory
Territorial changes	Ostrogoths captured Milan

Belligerents
Byzantine Empire	Ostrogothic kingdom

Commanders and leaders
Mundilas (surrendered)	Uraias

Strength
Unknown local garrison; 300 Isaurians and Thracians (POW)	Unknown Gothic forces; 10,000 Burgundians

Casualties and losses
Male citizens (executed); Women (POW)	Unknown

The siege of Milan, also known as siege of Mediolanum, took place in April 538 – March 539 AD where the Ostrogoths (Goths) seized control of Milan from the Byzantine Empire, as part of the Gothic War (535–554).

After the Goths lifted their siege of Rome, Byzantine general Belisarius sent Mundilas to occupy Milan in April 538. The non-Goth citizens of Milan welcomed the Byzantine forces. Upon the news, the Gothic King Vitiges sent an army under the leadership of his nephew Uraias, along with Burgundian allies, to recover Milan. During the siege, the city endured severe famine as relief efforts by the Byzantines were delayed due to disputes among their leadership, Belisarius and Narses. Eventually, Milan capitulated in March 539, the Goths killed the male inhabitants as punishment for the city's earlier revolt, and the women were sold to the Burgundians for their assistance in the siege. After the city was razed, the Goths recovered much of the Liguria region. The fall of Milan was a major setback for the Byzantine campaign in Italy and exposed flaws in their command structure. In response to the fall of Milan, Emperor Justinian called Narses back to Constantinople, leaving Belisarius as the sole commander-in-chief of the Byzantine forces in Italy.

== Gothic War ==
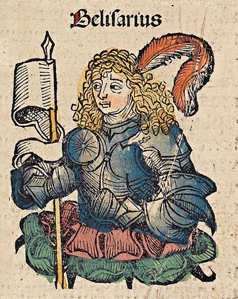
Belisarius in the Nuremberg Chronicle, 1493

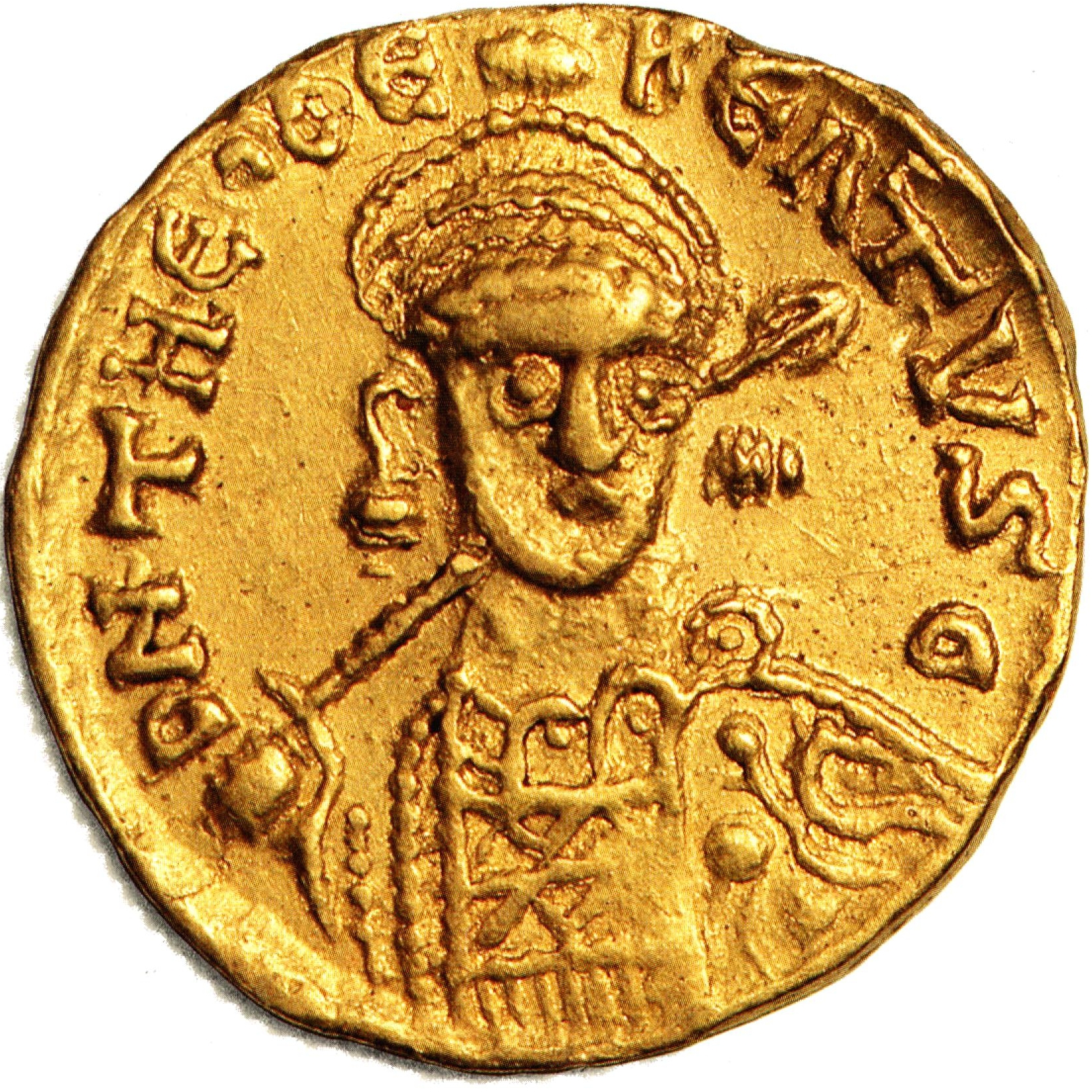
A coin depicting Theudebert I, the Frankish king who contributed to the fall of Milan

In 535 AD, the Byzantine Emperor Justinian launched a campaign to liberate the Italian cities that were under the control of the Ostrogothic Kingdom. The commanders Belisarius, Mundus and Constantinianus had made swift gains, conquering Sicily and then southern Italian Peninsula, as well as regions of Dalmatia and Liburnia.

Following the capture of Naples, Belisarius entered Rome in December 536, prompting the king of the Goths, Vitiges, to march with an army that had superior numbers to besiege the city (contemporary historian Procopius claimed a Gothic force of 150,000 (Note: The size of the army is plausible as it represented a national army in which all Goth males were required to serve in the army. However, historian J. B. Bury considered it an exaggeration. Historian Leif Petersen proposed an army size of 25,000–30,000 for besieging Rome, but considers Procopius's number to be a reasonable estimate of the total Gothic army in all their territories and navy. Historian Roy Boss argued for a 40,000-strong Gothic army.)). The Siege of Rome (537–538) featured repeated Gothic assaults on Rome's walls, countered by Belisarius's defensive preparations, use of artillery, and cavalry sorties that exploited the Goths' difficulties in countering mounted archers. Both sides suffered from shortages and disease, but Byzantine control of sea supply routes gradually weakened the besieging Goths, who faced greater logistical challenges in supplying their large army by land.

The siege of Rome by the Goths failed because Belisarius sent John the Sanguinary along with a cavalry detachment to raid Picenum. John ignored the fortified towns of Auximus and Urbinus and instead captured the city of Ariminum. The loss of Ariminum led Vitigis to lift the siege of Rome and to recover Ariminum, due to its strategic location, i.e., a day's march from Ravenna, the capital of the Gothic kingdom. Belisarius sought to replace John's cavalry with infantry, but John refused to obey. Soon after this, the Goths besieged Ariminum and trapped John inside the town. Belisarius joined forces with Chamberlain Narses, who had arrived with reinforcements from Constantinople. John's insubordination divided the Byzantine leadership into two factions: Belisarius and his supporters on one side, and Narses, who supported John, on the other. Belisarius was convinced by Narses to rescue John despite his insubordination.

Even with the reinforcements, Belisarius wanted to avoid a battle with the numerically superior Gothic forces, and devised a plan that took into account psychological warfare. He divided his forces into three detachments and advanced on Ariminum from different directions, deliberately leaving one escape route open. Additional campfires were lit to exaggerate the size of the Byzantine army. Alarmed by what they believed to be a massive force, the Goths withdrew towards Ravenna, and in July 538, Belisarius entered the town. After the victory, John refused to acknowledge Belisarius and instead credited Narses, who had convinced Belisarius to intervene. From this point on, Narses and John challenged Belisarius's leadership and began to act independently of his command.

== Prelude ==
=== Byzantine capture of Milan ===
After the Goths withdrew from Rome, Belisarius sent 1,000 Isaurians and Thracians, as he had promised to Dantius, the archbishop of Milan. The Byzantine forces reached Genoa from Portus via the sea. Along with them came Fidelius, who was a native of Milan and praetorian prefect of Belisarius, to act as a representative of the Byzantines' good intentions. In April 538, after crossing the river Po, they fought a pitched battle with the garrison of Milan, which had left the city, and won. At that time, Fidelius went to pray in a nearby church, and when he fell from his horse, Goths from the city came out of the city and killed him. Despite the loss of Fidelius, the Byzantine forces moved on and captured Milan. The Goth citizens of Milan felt betrayed when the rest of the Milanese citizens welcomed the Byzantine troops into the city. The Byzantines also captured nearby towns of Bergamum, Comum, and Novaria, which were necessary to secure Liguria region. The loss of Liguria caused concerns among the Goths, who had deposited significant parts of their wealth. Acting on the news, Vitigis sent Uraias, his nephew, with an army to recover Milan.

=== Frankish reinforcements ===
Theodebert I, who became king of Austrasia in 533 AD, ruled territories on both sides of the Rhine as well as parts of Aquitaine and Burgundy. Although he had promised Justinian military support and was even called "father" in one of his letters, Theodebert pursued an opportunistic and expansionist policy. Ignoring his pledge, he instead chose to aid the Goths, sending 10,000 Burgundians across the Alps to support Uraias. He claimed back to Justinian that the Burgundian army, having no Franks within, was not under his command and instead acting independently from his authority.

== Military actions ==
=== Siege ===
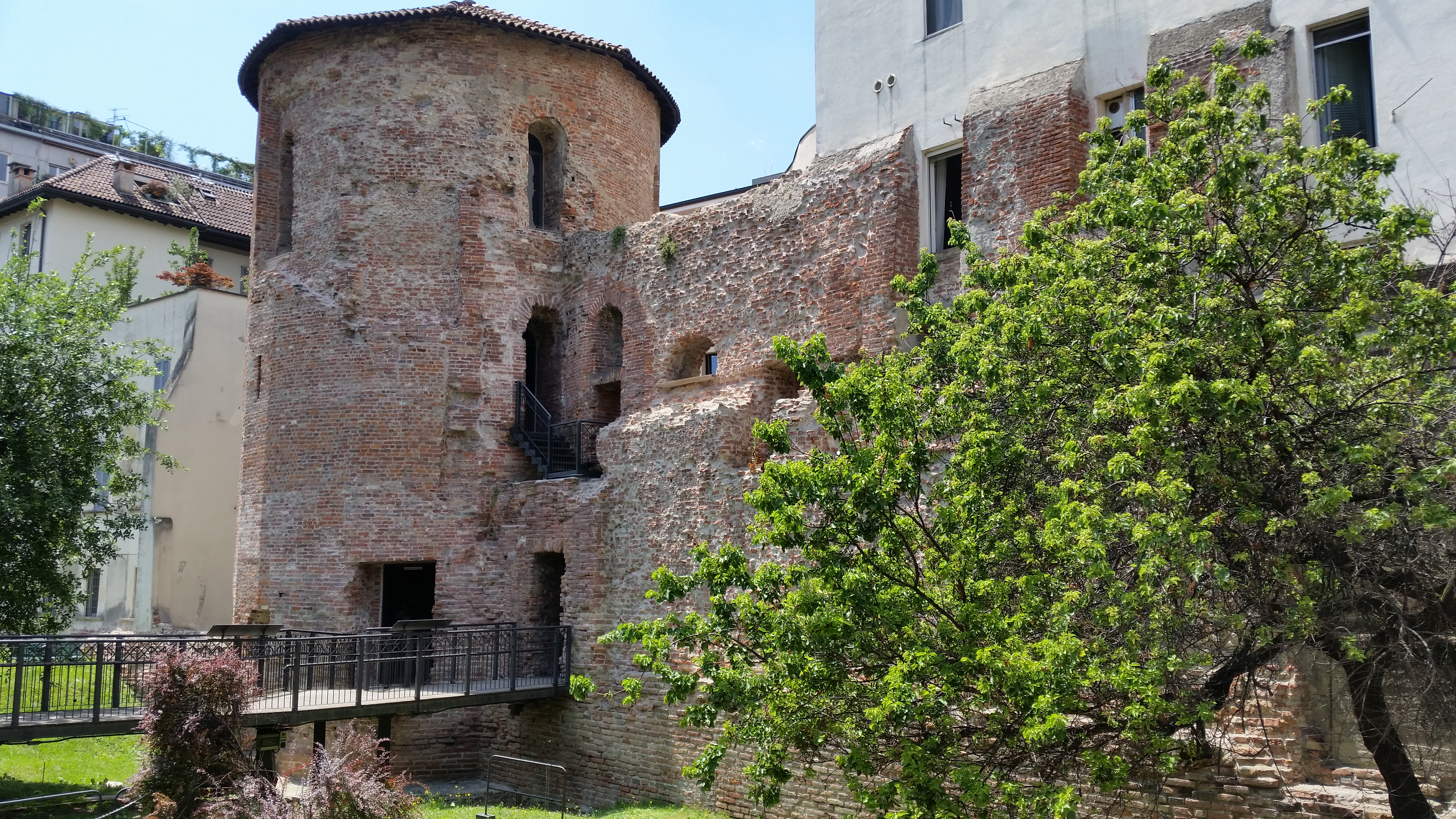
Remains of the Roman walls of Milan located inside the Civic Archaeological Museum of Milan

Soon after April 538, Gothic forces under Uraias surrounded Milan, isolating the city and cutting off supplies. As time progressed, starvation became severe inside the walls. Mundilas had 300 soldiers under his command, while the remaining 700 soldiers were distributed to other outposts in the area. He also relied on civilian support for the defense of the city.

=== Byzantine division and siege relief delays ===
Belisarius recognized the growing tensions with Narses, fueled by his aides, and convened a meeting with the army officers. At the meeting, he cautioned the officers against overconfidence, noting that the Goths still held numerical superiority and had only been defeated through the united Byzantine leadership. Belisarius outlined the surrounding Gothic forces and proposed dividing the army to relieve Milan while besieging Auximus, a strategic stronghold for the capture of Ravenna. Narses opposed this plan, arguing instead for securing Via Aemilia and pressuring Ravenna. (Note: Historian Ilkka Syvänne argues that Narses's strategy overlooked Gothic logistical weaknesses and effectively abandoned Milan, noting that eventually Belisarius proved correct.) Upon hearing Narses's argument, Belisarius revealed to him the emperor's letter stating that he had supreme authority.

We have not sent our steward Narses to Italy to command the army; for we wish Belisarius alone to command the whole army in whatever manner seems to him to be best, and it is the duty of all of you to follow him in the interest of our state.

Narses responded that Belisarius's proposals were not "in the interests of the state" and thus he could not follow them.

Belisarius continued to act as if the leadership was still united. He conducted the siege of Urbinus in which Narses and John participated. When negotiations with the Gothic garrison failed, John proclaimed that the city could not be captured, and Narses agreed. Despite Belisarius's pleas to stay, they withdrew their troops. Despite the setback, Belisarius employed conventional siege tactics with the construction of siege engines, but just before the Byzantine forces stormed the walls, the defenders surrendered because the only stream supplying the town with fresh water dried up. Astonished by such success, Narses sent John to capture Caesena, but this assault failed. John then moved to and captured Forocornelius. After the siege of Urbinus, Belisarius moved to support the siege of Urviventus upon rumors that the garrison was low on supplies, also capturing that city shortly after.

Despite sporadic successes, the divided Byzantine forces soon became ineffective. Belisarius returned to Rome for the winter, but in late December, he sent an army under Martinus and Uliaris to relieve the siege of Milan. However, they hesitated to cross the Po River. (Note: Historian Ian Hughes considers that the river may have overflowed due to seasonal rains.) Mundilas managed to send word that the city was near collapse, prompting Martinus to request reinforcements. Belisarius ordered John and Justinus, who were closest (Aemilia region), to assist; however, they refused, citing Narses as their commander. Belisarius appealed to Narses, who approved the order, but when John set out to gather ships to cross the river Po, he fell ill, further delaying relief.

=== Negotiations and surrender ===
As the inhabitants of Milan were reduced to extreme starvation, Mundilas received envoys offering to spare the garrison's lives if they surrendered (placed in honorable captivity). Mundilas was willing to accept only if the civilians were also protected, but the Goths countered with protecting only the Goths living in the city, who felt betrayed by the Ligurians (Milanese inhabitants siding with the Byzantines) and sought revenge. Although Mundilas initially rejected the terms, his exhausted troops refused to attempt a sally and compelled him to accept the surrender conditions. Milan opened the gates to Goths in March 539.

== Aftermath ==
Contemporary historian Procopius recorded that the Goths executed 300,000 (Note: Historian John Bury argued this number may be exaggerated. Furthermore, Bury noted that, according to this figure, Milan had a population of approximately 600,000, similar to its population in 1958.) men, sold the women of Milan to Burgundians as payment for their services, and razed the city to the ground. Milan, according to Procopius, was a populous and prosperous city on equal footing with Rome, and so the vengeful act by the Goths caused irrevocable damage. (Note: Historian John Bury remarked that even in Attila's campaigns, there was no act of comparable savagery.) Other notable people in the city did not have a better fate; they executed Reparatus, brother of Pope Vigilius and Praetorian prefecture of Italy by cutting him into pieces and throwing him to the dogs. A brother of Reparatus, Cerventinus, escaped to Constantinople, where he told the events of the city's fall to Justinian. The fall of Milan also led to the surrender of the recently captured towns of Bergomum, Comum, and Novaria. As a result of this setback, Narses was called back to Constantinople, while Belisarius, being the sole commander-in-chief of the Byzantine forces in Italy, prepared a campaign to capture Ravenna.
