= John (nephew of the consul Vitalian) =

Byzantine general (active 537–553)

John the Sanguinary
- Relatives: Bouzes, Coutzes and Venilus (cousins); Vitalian (uncle)
- Military career
- Allegiance: Byzantine Empire
- Rank: Magister militum
- Conflicts: Gothic War (535–554); Siege of Ariminum (538); Siege of Urbinus (538); Siege of Milan (538–539); Siege of Verona (541); Battle of Faventia (542); Battle of Mucellium (542); Battle of Sena Gallica (551); Battle of Taginae (552)

John (Latin: Ioannes, Greek: Ίωάννης, fl. 537–553), also known as John the Sanguinary, was a Byzantine general under Justinian I (r. 527–565) and took an active part in the Gothic War (535–554) against the Ostrogoths (Goths). He was the nephew of the rebel Vitalian, and later in life he married Justina, the daughter of Justinian's cousin Germanus.

By 537, he had gained a reputation for bravery and command ability. He was tasked by Justinian with bringing supplies and reinforcements to Belisarius, who was defending Rome from a numerically superior Gothic army. Following his arrival, Belisarius assigned John to raid the Picenum region. John took the initiative and captured the strategically important city of Ariminum due to its proximity to the Gothic capital, Ravenna. The loss of Ariminum forced the Goths to abandon the siege of Rome and march north toward their capital. Despite his success, he disobeyed Belisarius's orders to leave Ariminum, and John was soon trapped by Gothic forces advancing from Rome. Belisarius was able to save him in the Siege of Ariminum (538); however, John refused to thank him. John's insubordination became a focal point in the fracturing Byzantine leadership, leading to the destruction of Milan. In the final part of the Gothic War, he followed Narses and defeated the Goths at the Battle of Taginae and Mons Lactarius, which ended the war.

== Biography ==
=== Origins and family ===
John was the nephew of Vitalian, who was consul in 520 and magister militum praesentalis of Emperor Justin I. Vitalian was assassinated, probably at the instigation of Justinian, the powerful nephew and later successor of Justin I. By 537, John had become a successful soldier with a reputation for his bravery and austere lifestyle. Historian John R. Martindale presumes that by 537, John held the title of Magister militum. The epithet of 'Sanguinary' was not used by contemporary historian Procopius, but appears later in the Papal bibliography due to his eagerness to join a battle.

=== Siege of Rome ===
In mid 537, John sailed from Constantinople to Taranto with 800 Thracian and 1,000 regular cavalry as part of reinforcements to Belisarius who was defending Rome since 2 March 537 against a numerically superior Gothic army under the King Vitiges. John received wagons filled with supplies (corn and wine) from the inhabitants of Calabria, which he brought to Campania. There, his troops joined the 500 men already assembled by Procopius, contemporary historian and Belisarius's assessor. The combined force then marched along the coastal road. He reached Rome in December 537, and the supplies were safely delivered during the negotiations of an armistice by Belisarius and Gothic envoys.

=== Siege of Ariminum ===
Operations during the first five years of the war, featuring the conquest of Italy directed by Belisarius and Dalamatia by Mundus and Constantinianus

In March 538, and while the siege of Rome was ongoing, Belisarius sent John to raid the Picenum region. John defeated the Gothic commander Ulitheus (uncle of Vitiges) in battle, gaining a reputation among the Goths. He ignored the cities of Auximus and Urbinus due to their strong garrisons. When he approached Ariminum, its citizens invited John to take the town. John realized the importance of Ariminum, a day's march from the Gothic capital of Ravenna, and that its capture would force Vitiges to lift the siege of Rome. The Gothic garrison retreated from Ariminum to Ravenna "as soon as they learned that [John's] army was approaching", and John took the city without resistance. In the meantime, Vitiges's wife, Mataswintha, opened negotiations with John and proposed the idea of marriage, on account of Vitiges marrying her by force. John's reputation was bolstered by the capture of the town, and, according to Procopius, John and Mataswintha frequently exchanged messages.

Schematic capturing the conceptual plan of Belisarius to break the siege of Ariminum and save John

The loss of Ariminum led Vitiges to lift the siege of Rome and attempt to recover the city, due to its strategic location. Belisarius sought to replace John's cavalry with infantry, but John refused to obey. Soon after this, the Goths besieged Ariminum and trapped John inside the town. Belisarius joined forces with Justinian's chamberlain (cubicularius), Narses, who had arrived with reinforcements from Constantinople. John's insubordination divided the Byzantine command. Belisarius and his supporters accused John of recklessness and ruining Belisarius's strategy, while Narses supported John. Belisarius was convinced by Narses to rescue John despite his insubordination by arguing that losing John and his men would boost the morale of the Goths.

Even with the reinforcements, Belisarius wanted to avoid a battle with the numerically superior Gothic forces, and devised a plan that took into account psychological warfare. He divided his forces into three detachments and advanced on Ariminum from different directions, deliberately leaving one escape route open. Additional campfires were lit to exaggerate the size of the Byzantine army. Alarmed by what they believed to be a massive force, the Goths withdrew towards Ravenna, and in late summer 538, Belisarius entered the town. After the victory, John refused to acknowledge Belisarius's role and instead credited Narses, who had convinced Belisarius to intervene.

=== Division in Byzantine leadership ===
John's insubordination had wider consequences. Belisarius convened a meeting with the army officers, where he cautioned the officers against overconfidence, noting that the Goths still held numerical superiority and had only been defeated through the united Byzantine leadership. Belisarius outlined the surrounding Gothic forces and proposed dividing the army to relieve Milan, which was under siege by Goths and Burgundians, while besieging Auximus, a strategic stronghold for the capture of Ravenna. Narses opposed this plan, arguing instead for securing Via Aemilia and pressuring Ravenna. (Note: Historian Ilkka Syvänne argues that Narses's strategy overlooked Gothic logistical weaknesses and effectively abandoned Milan, noting that eventually Belisarius proved correct.) Upon hearing Narses's argument, Belisarius revealed to him the emperor's letter stating that he had supreme authority.

We have not sent our steward Narses to Italy in order to command the army; for we wish Belisarius alone to command the whole army in whatever manner seems to him to be best, and it is the duty of all of you to follow him in the interest of our state.

Narses responded that Belisarius's proposals were not "in the interests of the state" and thus he could not follow them. Belisarius continued to act as if the leadership was still united. He initiated the siege of Urbinus in which Narses and John initially followed. When negotiations with the Gothic garrison of Urbinus failed, John proclaimed that the city could not be captured, and Narses agreed. Despite Belisarius's pleas to stay, they withdrew their troops. Narses and John intended to conquer Aemilia even without Belisarius's authorization. John was sent to capture Caesena, however, he failed as he was impatient with sieges. Instead, he advanced against Forum Cornelii (modern-day Imola), which was captured by surprise, contributing to the control of the Aemilian region.

Despite sporadic successes, the divided Byzantine forces soon became ineffective. Belisarius returned to Rome for the winter, but in late December, he sent an army under Martinus and Uliaris to relieve the Siege of Milan (538–539). However, they hesitated to cross the Po River. (Note: Historian Ian Hughes considers that the river may have overflowed due to seasonal rains.) Milan's garrison commander, Mundilas, managed to send word that the city was near collapse, prompting Martinus to request reinforcements. Belisarius ordered John and Justinus, who were closest (Aemilia region), to assist; however, they refused, citing Narses as their commander. Belisarius appealed to Narses, who approved the order, but when John set out to gather ships to cross the river Po, he fell ill, further delaying relief. The garrison in Milan eventually surrendered the city to the Goths, who killed the male inhabitants (Procopius estimated this at 300,000) as punishment for the city's earlier revolt and Burgundians were given the city's women to compensate for their assistance in the siege, and the city was razed. The setback prompted Justinian to recall Narses and give back the unitary command to Belisarius.

=== Administration of Italy and Gothic resurgence ===
Main army movements during the second phase of the Gothic War

In 540, Belisarius succeeded in capturing Ravenna, the capital of the Ostrogothic kingdom, effectively recovering all the territories of the Italian Peninsula south of the river Po. Belisarius was then recalled to Constantinople, taking Ravenna's treasury and Vitiges as prisoner, as he was needed to take command of the eastern borders against the Persians for the upcoming Lazic War (541–562). Justinian replaced Belisarius with John, Constantinianus, and Bessas. The commanders, having equal authority, meant there was no central authority, and their rivalry and corruption led to indiscipline and the plundering of the Italian countryside. Moreover, Justinian's harsh tax audit to recover alleged Gothic-era arrears, combined with reduced rewards for wounded and distinguished soldiers, further alienated troops and civilians, collapsing morale and eroding Italian loyalty.

Byzantine misrule strengthened the Goths under Ildibad, who defeated a Byzantine force at the Battle of Treviso and recovered much of the Po Valley. His reign was short-lived because he was assassinated before consolidating his power. The reign of Eraric followed, but it ended with his murder in late 541, because he secretly offered to abdicate and offer the kingdom to the Byzantines in exchange for the rank of patrician and a large payment. Through the turmoil among the Gothic aristocracy, Ildibad's nephew Totila became king. Reprimanded by Justinian for inaction to exploit Gothic disunity, the Byzantine commanders assembled and decided to capture Verona. However, their divided leadership (John was presumably one of the eleven commanders) failed to capture Verona. Totila pursued and defeated them in Battle of Faventia (542) by taking advantage of poor Byzantine leadership, who spent time debating rather than preventing Totila from crossing the river Po, and the low morale of their troops. Following the defeat, John retreated to Ravenna.

When Totila arrived to besiege Florence, the general in charge of the garrison, Justinus, asked for help from the commanders in Ravenna. John and other commanders marched to assist Justinus. Totila lifted the siege by retreating in the direction of Mugello as he was outnumbered. At the Battle of Mucellium, Totila routed the Byzantine army after one of John's bodyguards died, but mistakenly thought that it was John, causing panic to spread throughout the Byzantine army. John fled to Rome, where he took refuge and remained for the next two years. While in Rome, John prohibited the senators from responding to the overtures of Totila, and he expelled the Arian priests, fearing that they might conspire to do something for the benefit of the Goths. In 543, Constantinianus wrote to Justinian, supporting the other commanders in Italy and claiming that it was impossible to continue the war against Totila due to a lack of supplies and low morale among the troops. Justinian brought back Belisarius from the eastern front, replacing Constantinianus. In 545, John was replaced by Bessas on the orders of Belisarius.

In 545, John sailed to Constantinople at the orders of Belisarius to request reinforcements and supplies from Justinian. However, John failed to secure any of his tasks. He lingered a long time in Constantinople, despite the oath given to Belisarius to return as soon as possible, where he married Justina, the daughter of Germanus. Late in the following year, Justinian provided the means for an army at Epidamnus. Belisarius sailed to Portus to assist the defenders in the Siege of Rome (546) since they were outnumbered by Totila's army. John was ordered by Belisarius to land in south of Italy and to march through Calabria, driving the Goths out of the region and eventually reach Rome. When he returned to Italy, he avoided Belisarius and his wife in Rome. According to the Secret History of Procopius, Empress Theodora did not want Justina to marry, so John, by marrying her as she was above his station, would have attracted the hatred of the empress, to the point that John, fearing that Theodora could order Antonina (wife of Belisarius) to kill him. John managed to recover Lucania and Bruttium for the Byzantines. However, Rome fell as Belisarius had too few resources to prevent it. For the following years, Totila had overall the upper hand, able to recover and maintain control of most of the Italian Peninsula.

=== Narses's campaign ===
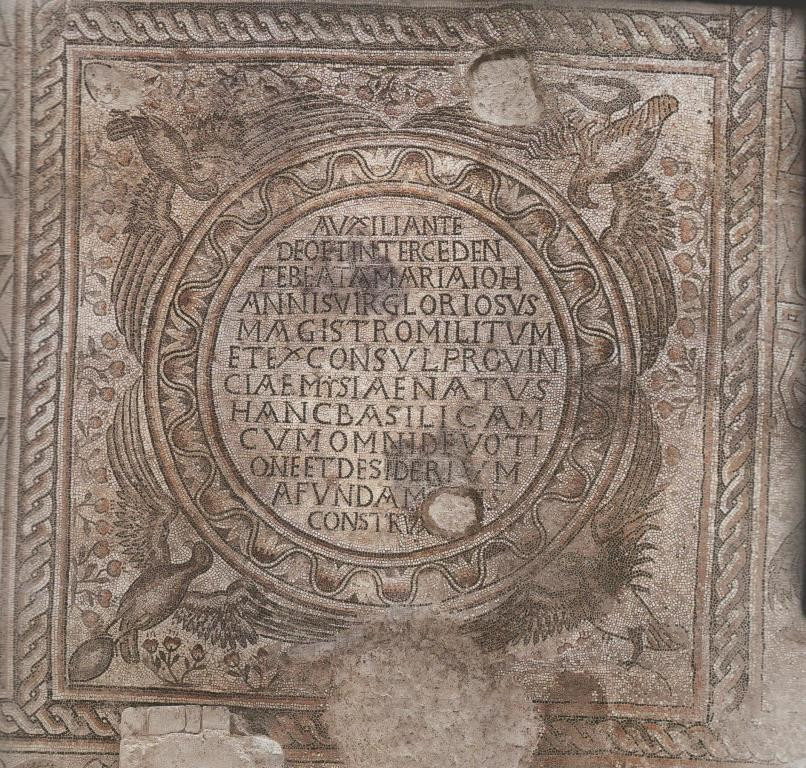
A mosaic in the Pesaro Cathedral celebrates John's military acumen.

As early as 549, Justinian planned to dispatch an army to Italy to conclude the war with the Goths. Germanus started recruiting an army for this purpose, but his sudden death in 550 led to a temporary postponement, as Justinian delayed selecting a replacement for the commander-in-chief of the campaign. In the meantime, John, stationed in Salona, was responsible for the task. During 550–551, an expeditionary force strong enough to remove the Goths from Italy was gradually assembled at Salona in Dalmatia, comprising regular Byzantine units and several contingents of foreign allies, notably Lombards, Heruls, and Bulgars. Narses was appointed to command in mid–551.

Before the arrival of Narses at Salona, John received a message from Valerian (commander stationed in Ravenna), who appealed for aid in providing relief to the besieged Ancon (modern-day Ancona) by land and sea in late 551. Despite explicit orders by Justinian to John not to take any initiative until the arrival of Narses, John sailed north to break the Gothic blockade near Sena Gallica (modern-day Senigallia). The two opposing fleets were approximately equal in size and engaged head-on. The Goths were less experienced, and they struggled to maintain formation during the battle, allowing the Byzantines to outflank isolated Gothic vessels. The weary Goths retreated. With the defeat of their fleet, the Goths abandoned the siege of Ancon.

Narses avoided crossing the sea to Italy due to the threat posed by the Gothic fleet in the southern Adriatic Sea. The following spring, he led the Byzantine army around the coast of the Adriatic Sea. The Franks controlled the land route through Venetia, but Narses failed to get permission to pass on the grounds that the Lombards in the Byzantine army were bitter enemies of the Franks. He also faced the threat posed by the Gothic commander Teias, who held Verona. Teias, with the best Gothic troops, hindered a Byzantine crossing of the river Po, positioning himself to strike any attempted passage. To bypass these dangers, Narses adopted a plan proposed by John, who knew the region well: the army would march along the river coast while a fleet sailed alongside, ferrying troops across river mouths as needed. Though slow, this strategy allowed the Byzantine army to reach Ravenna safely in the summer of 552, and after a nine-day break, Narses proceeded towards Rome. Totila realized that a defensive strategy would force him to fracture his army, and he marched to intercept Narses. At the Battle of Taginae, Narses and John defeated the Gothic army, where Totila was mortally wounded. Teia took up the leadership of the Goths, but was also defeated and killed in the Battle of Mons Lactarius in the same year. The remaining Goths negotiated their surrender, and John advised Narses to accept, which he did, ending the war as the Goths failed to recover.

== Sources ==
=== Primary ===
- Procopius (1919) [545–553 AD]. Procopius: History of the Wars, Books V and VI. Translated by Bronson Dewing, Henry. Cambridge, MA: Harvard University Press – via Project Gutenberg.
- Procopius (1924) [545–553 AD]. Procopius: History of the Wars, Books VI and VII. Translated by Bronson Dewing, Henry. Cambridge, MA: Harvard University Press. OCLC 491843455.

=== Secondary ===
- Bury, John Bagnell (1958). History of the Later Roman Empire: From the Death of Theodosius I to the Death of Justinian. Vol. 2. Mineola, New York: Dover Publications, Inc.
- Martindale, John R. (1992). The Prosopography of the Later Roman Empire 2 Part Set: Volume 3, AD 527–641. Cambridge University Press. ISBN 978-0-521-20160-5.
- Heather, Peter J. (2018). Rome Resurgent: War and Empire in the Age of Justinian. New York: Oxford University Press. ISBN 9780199362745. OCLC 1007044617.
- Hodgkin, Thomas (1896). Italy and Her Invaders: The imperial restoration, 535–553. Oxford: Clarendon Press. OCLC 5080433.
- Hughes, Ian (2009). Belisarius: The Last Roman General. Yardley, PA: Westholme. ISBN 9781594160851. OCLC 294885267.
- Parnell, David A. (2015). "The social networks of Justinian's generals". Journal of Late Antiquity. 8 (1): 114–135. doi:10.1353/jla.2015.0009.
- Syvänne, Ilkka (2021). Military History of Late Rome 518–565. Yorkshire, PA: Pen and Sword Military. ISBN 978-1-47-389530-0.
