= Siege of Ariminum (538) =

Engagement during Justinian's Gothic War

- Part of the Gothic War (535–554)
- First phase of Gothic War campaigns
Date	April – Late summer 538
Location	Ariminum (present-day Rimini), Italy 44°03′34″N 12°34′06″E
Result	Byzantine victory
Territorial changes	Ariminum successfully captured and defended

Belligerents
Byzantine Empire	Ostrogothic Kingdom

Commanders and leaders
Belisarius; Narses; John; Martinus	Vitiges

Strength
Unknown under Belisarius (Note: Belisarius had 5,000 men under his command during the Siege of Rome. Although he received reinforcements, his army was still small compared to the Gothic army.); 7,000 under Narses; 3,200 garrison under John	Unknown (Note: Contemporary historian and witness Procopius provided 150,000 as the size of Gothic forces during the Siege of Rome (537–538). Modern historians doubt this number, providing lower estimates, but without a clear consensus: Ian Hughes considers 20,000–25,000, Leif Petersen estimates at 25,000–30,000, Roy Boss provides 40,000, and Dupuy estimates 50,000. Historians Torsten Jacobsen and Ilkka Syvänne argued that Procopius's number should not be doubted as the Gothic army was a national army in which every able male had to participate, and the peace and prosperity of the last decades had increased the population of the Goths. Will Durant also used Procopius's number. During the Siege of Ariminum, the size of the Gothic would be smaller from Procopius number due to the loss of 30,000 men during the Siege of Rome, and Vitiges reinforcing several Gothic outposts during his return to Arinimum (9,800 men).)

The Siege of Ariminum, also known as the Siege of Rimini, was an encounter in 538 AD during the Gothic War, where the Byzantine forces broke the siege by the Ostrogoths (Goths).

In early 538 and during the Siege of Rome (537–538), the besieged Byzantine General Belisarius sent John the Sanguinary to raid the Picenum region. John took the initiative and captured Ariminum, near the Gothic capital, Ravenna, to entice the Goths into lifting the Siege of Rome. Belisarius sent reinforcements to Ariminum and ordered John to leave the city, as his cavalry forces would not be useful in the case of a siege. However, John refused to obey and stayed in the city. In the meantime, fearing for their capital, the Goths retreated from Rome in mid-March 538 and moved north. In April they besieged Ariminum, trapping John and his troops. They were unsuccessful in taking Ariminum by force, and instead, the leader of the Gothic forces, Vitiges, decided to starve the town.

Initially, the Byzantine leadership was divided over whether to rescue John despite his insubordination. Belisarius ultimately chose to save him after an appeal from Chamberlain Narses that John's loss would boost the morale of the Goths. Belisarius wanted to avoid a direct engagement because the Goths outnumbered the Byzantine forces. He split his army into smaller groups and sent them to Ariminum by land and sea. The near-simultaneous arrival of Byzantine forces from multiple directions created the impression of a much larger army, which unnerved the Goths. As a result, they abandoned the siege in late summer 538 and withdrew to Ravenna. Despite the victory, disagreements over John's insubordination fractured the unity of the Byzantine leadership and shaped the course of the Gothic War.

== Primary sources ==
Procopius of Caesarea is the major Greek historian of late antiquity and the main source for Justinian I's reign of Byzantium. In Books V–VIII of the History of the Wars (published in 553 AD), Procopius described the Gothic War (535–554), and it is largely paraphrased by modern scholarship as it is the sole source that covered these events. He was Belisarius's assessor, being an eyewitness to military engagements, having access to official information, and knowledge of military affairs. These advantages placed him in a unique position to reconstruct the wars in the Middle East, Africa, and Italy. Procopius adopted a classical style in narrating the events, inspired by historians such as Thucydides and Herodotus, emphasizing moral explanation through dramatic speeches over strict documentary accuracy.

Procopius's work is largely factual, and even though he was on the Byzantine side, it is neither entirely neutral nor propaganda. He portrayed Belisarius favorably over other Byzantine commanders, reflecting personal loyalty, and disproportionately emphasized mounted combat, marginalizing the role of infantry in battles and sieges. In the first part of the History of the Wars, his view of Justinian is characterized by enthusiasm and optimism, following Belisarius as the main protagonist until he left Italy in mid-summer 540. The narrative then shifts to the Gothic resurgence under Totila, who emerges as both the central figure and a tragic hero in Procopius's account of the later stages of the Gothic War. Procopius's disillusionment with Justinian's reign becomes clear in the unpublished (written in 551) book Secret History. In the Secret History, Procopius presents history as a moral struggle in which effective rulers maintain order, criticizing Justinian not for his imperial ambitions but for the disorder and instability his actions allegedly caused.

== Background ==
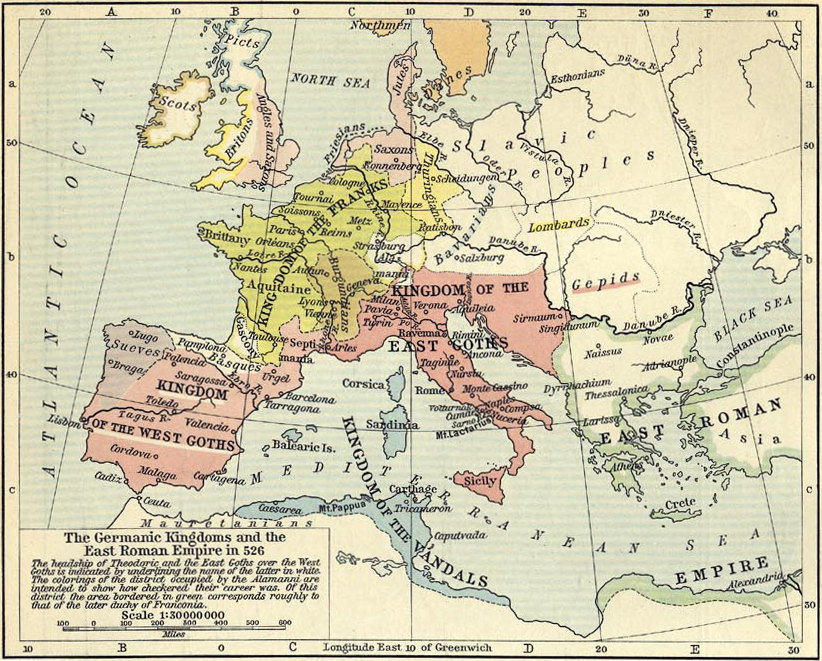
Map of the Byzantine (East Roman) Empire and the Germanic kingdoms of the western Mediterranean in 526

In 476 AD, the last western Roman emperor, Romulus Augustulus, was deposed and authority passed to the Germanic general Odoacer, though he nominally recognized the supremacy of the Byzantine emperor in Constantinople. In 493, Odoacer was overthrown and killed by Theodoric the Great, who sought the creation of an independent kingdom by balancing the Gothic military dominance with the preservation of Byzantine civil institutions. For several decades, Theodoric's regime maintained relative stability, fostering cooperation between the senatorial elite in Rome and the Gothic ruling class. The Byzantines were unable to interfere in the Italian Peninsula. While Theodoric asked the then Byzantine Emperor Zeno for permission to wear the Roman royal regalia, the emperor died in 491 before deciding. Similarly, Emperor Anastasius initially did not consent, but in 497 accepted the usurpation. Theodoric used the titles rex and princeps (first citizen) and before his death, the Ostrogothic kingdom was the strongest barbarian nation occupying lands of the former Western Roman Empire.

After Theodoric's death in 526, his daughter, Amalasuntha, attempted to continue pro-Byzantine policies and maintain close ties with Byzantium under Emperor Justinian. However, she maintained her position as regent until her son came of age by relying on the assassination of political opponents, on Byzantine advisers, and her son had a Byzantine education. These policies alienated segments of the Gothic nobility. Following her son's death in 534, the opposition revived the question of succession, culminating in Amalasuntha's deposition and murder by Theodahad in 535. Justinian considered this as a casus belli (cause of war) justification to intervene militarily in the Italian Peninsula. Framing his campaign as both a defense of a legitimate ruler and a restoration of imperial authority, he launched a military campaign that became known as the Gothic War.

At the time, the Byzantines had successfully conquered North Africa in the Vandalic War (533–534) and made preparations against the Goths. Following the fallout with Theodahad, Justinian opened two fronts against the Goths in 535. Specifically, Belisarius conquered Sicily and then southern Italian Peninsula with limited resistance, while Mundus and later Constantinianus seized Salona, the capital of Dalmatia region. The Goths failed to counter the Byzantine offensives, while Theodahad secretly negotiated with Justinian. The capture of Naples by Belisarius in 536, prompted the assassination of Theodahad by the men of Vitiges. Belisarius entered Rome on 9 December 536.

== Prelude ==
=== Siege of Rome ===
In response to the loss of Rome, Vitiges, as the new king of the Goths, marched with an army that had superior numbers to besiege the city. The Siege of Rome (537–538) featured repeated Gothic assaults on Rome's walls, countered by Belisarius's defensive preparations, use of artillery, and cavalry sorties that exploited the Goths' difficulties in countering mounted archers. Both sides suffered from shortages and disease, but Byzantine control of sea supply routes gradually weakened the besieging Goths, who faced greater logistical challenges in supplying their large army by land.

=== Capture of Ariminum and John's insubordination ===
In March 538, and while the Siege of Rome was ongoing, Belisarius sent John, nephew of the Byzantine general Vitalianus, to raid Picenum. John defeated the Gothic commander Ulitheus (uncle of Vitiges) in battle, gaining a reputation among the Goths. He ignored the cities of Auximus and Urbinus due to their strong garrisons. When he approached Ariminum, its citizens invited John to take the town. John realized the importance of Ariminum, which was one to two days' march away from the Gothic capital of Ravenna, and its capture would force Vitiges to lift the Siege of Rome. The Gothic garrison retreated from Ariminum to Ravenna "as soon as they learned that [John's] army was approaching", and John took the city without resistance. In the meantime, Vitiges' wife, Mataswintha, opened negotiations with John and proposed the idea of marriage, on account of Vitiges marrying her by force. John's reputation was bolstered by the town's capture, and according to Procopius, John and Mataswintha frequently exchanged messages.

The Goths, upon hearing the fall of Ariminum, lifted the Siege of Rome on 12 March 538 and traveled towards Ravenna. Their travel was slow because they moved as a large army and took detours to avoid the Byzantine fortresses at Narnia, Spoletium, and Perusia. Belisarius, anticipating that the Goths would attempt to besiege Ariminum, sent infantry forces to Ariminum before the Goths' arrival to replace John and his cavalry unit. Belisarius's order was motivated by two reasons: first, the Goths would not consider a small garrison with an unknown commander as a threat and focus their attention elsewhere. Second, John's cavalry would not be as effective in a siege as it was when harassing the Goths in the open; during a siege, the horses would also consume more food. However, John disobeyed the orders and stayed in Ariminum with the infantry reinforcements sent by Belisarius.

== Army movements and engagements ==
=== Siege ===
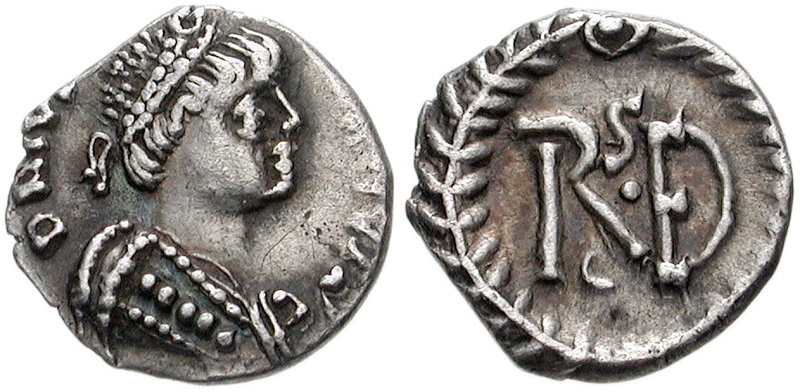
Quarter Siliqua of Vitiges (also known as Witigis)

Vitiges besieged the town of Ariminum upon the arrival of the Gothic forces in April 538. They built a siege tower which, unlike during the siege of Rome, was not pulled by oxen, but moved by men stationed inside. The tower was placed relatively close to the wall with the expectation that it would be used the following day. During the night, the Byzantines sortied out of the town to dig a trench in front of the siege tower. When the Goths found out, they attacked the Byzantines, who retreated as soon as the trench was deep enough. In response, Vitiges had the trench filled with faggots before moving the siege tower over it. Crushing the supporting faggots beneath it, the tower sank into the trench. Its advance was then halted by an earthwork built from the excavated dirt. Vitiges ordered that the night guards responsible for this setback be executed.

Vitiges decided to withdraw, taking the tower with him. John wanted to prevent this and sallied out, but was unsuccessful at destroying the siege tower. Having suffered many casualties, Vitiges decided against storming Ariminum and began starving it out. Needing fewer men for this, he also sent men to attack Ancon.

=== Debate on saving John ===
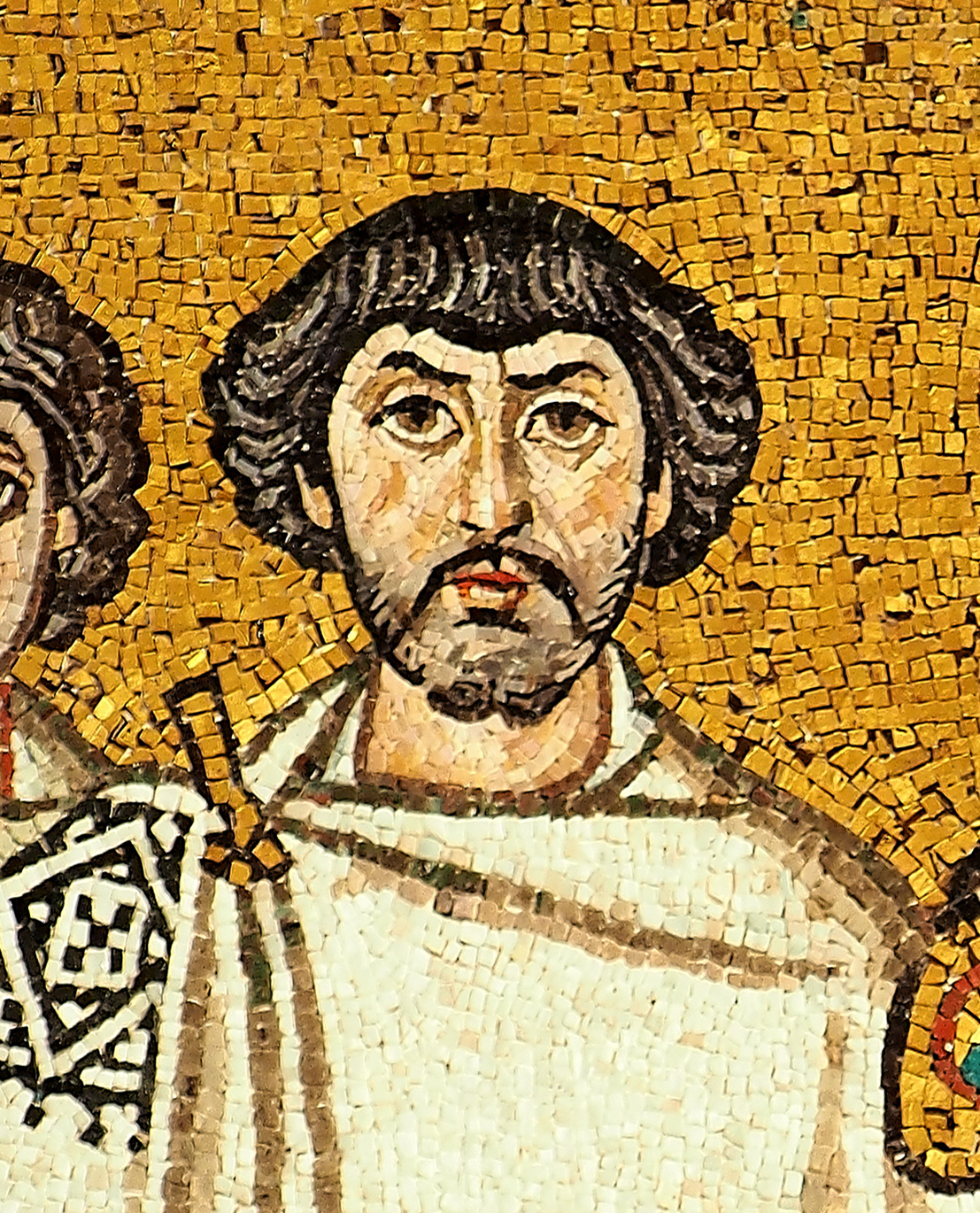
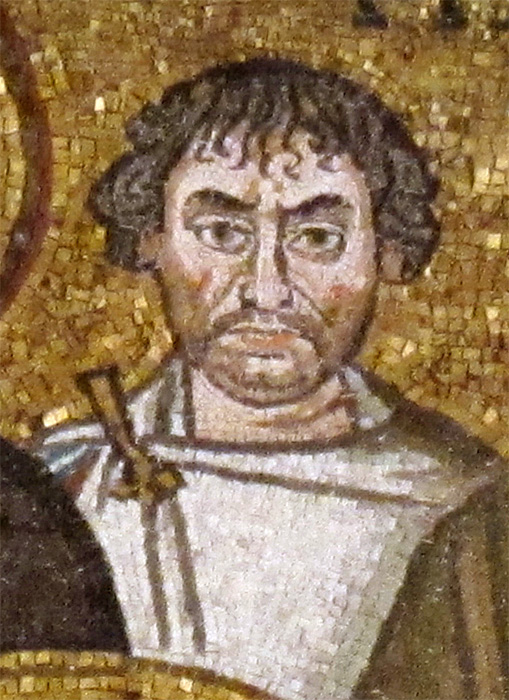
Mosaics, 6th century, depicting Belisarius (left) and Narses (right), from the Basilica of San Vitale, Ravenna, Italy

Belisarius, after securing the area surrounding Rome, took his main army and marched north in late June. At Firmum he met Justinian's chamberlain (cubicularius), Narses, along with 7,000 reinforcements from Constantinople. In mid-summer 548, they convened a council of officers to decide whether the army should march to John's aid in Ariminum. Most of the officers opposed helping John, resentful of his challenge to Belisarius's authority. Narses, however, appealed to Belisarius and his officers to carry out the rescue.

Now if John treated your commands with insolence, most excellent Belisarius, the atonement you have already exacted from him is surely ample, since it is now in your power either to save him in his reverse or to abandon him to the enemy. But see that you do not exact from the emperor and from us the penalty for mistakes committed by John through ignorance. For if the Goths capture Ariminum at the present juncture, it will be their good fortune to have made captive a capable Byzantine general, as well as a whole army and a city subject to the emperor.

Narses's argument and John's message stating that he would be forced to surrender to the Goths in seven days if there was no support convinced Belisarius to rescue John and Ariminum.

=== Belisarius's stratagem ===
Schematic capturing the conceptual plan of Belisarius to break the Siege of Ariminum.

Belisarius wanted to avoid actual fighting because the Goths outnumbered the Byzantines. He split his army into smaller groups, three of which were sent to the vicinity of Ariminum. The central idea was to surround the Goths from three sides, leaving only one safe passage to escape. One group, led by Ildiger, was to move by sea, accompanied by a group led by Martinus on land. Meanwhile, Belisarius and Narses came through the Apennines, passing Urbisaglia. Their forces encountered a group of Gothic soldiers, who were defeated. The survivors fled back to the Gothic camp and claimed that the Byzantines were approaching with a large force from the north. This led the Goths to move their camps to the north of Ariminum.

In the meantime, Martinus' forces approaching from the south lit numerous campfires at night, which projected a larger force than the true Byzantine strength. The appearance of the Byzantine fleet on the following day further shook the Goths. Later in the summer of 538, the Goths lifted their Siege of Ariminum and moved to Ravenna. Belisarius and his army entered Ariminum around noon.

== Aftermath ==
After the siege, John declined to express any gratitude to Belisarius and instead claimed that Narses deserved the credit because it was Narses who had compelled Belisarius to come to his rescue. Narses and John, along with their supporters, withdrew from the main army and acted independently from Belisarius. Byzantine forces, unable to act together due to division in their leadership, became ineffective. Poor coordination led to the loss of the major city of Mediolanum (modern-day Milan) to the Goths in early 539. The Goths executed the entire male population, which according to Procopius numbered 300,000, (Note: Historian J. B. Bury argued this number may be exaggerated. Furthermore, Bury noted that, according to this figure, Milan had a population of approximately 600,000, similar to its population in 1958.) sold the city's women to Burgundians, and razed the city to the ground. In response to this setback, Emperor Justinian called Narses back to Constantinople, leaving Belisarius as the sole commander-in-chief of the Byzantine forces in Italy.

In 539, Belisarius proceeded to secure strongholds in the region surrounding Ravenna. With the fall of Auximus, he advanced to besiege Ravenna, aiming to starve the garrison since the city had strong defensive advantages. While the Goth nobility negotiated their surrender and Justinian was willing to offer generous terms, Belisarius employed a stratagem to induce the Goths to surrender by offering them the Western Roman imperial crown. At the last moment, he refused the crown, but by then the Byzantine troops were in control of the city and had captured the Gothic king. The fall of Ravenna concluded the first phase of the Gothic War, with most of Italy under Byzantine control. The stratagem spooked Justinian, and Belisarius's rivals in the royal court accused him of usurpation. Although Belisarius returned to Constantinople in mid-summer 540 with Ravenna's treasury and the defeated Gothic King Vitiges as a prisoner, Justinian refused him a triumph. The general's departure from Italy had been required so he could serve on the eastern front against the Persians in the upcoming Lazic War (541–562), which ended as a stalemate. However, Belisarius's departure and the failure of Justinian to appoint a sole commander-in-chief of Byzantine forces in Italy reignited the Gothic resistance and prolonged the Gothic War by more than a decade.

== Scholarly assessment ==
Historians Ilkka Syvänne, Ian Hughes, and Antony Brogna argued that Belisarius's actions during the Siege of Ariminum are notable primarily for achieving victory without a fight against a numerically superior adversary. Specifically, they praise his ability as a commander to anticipate the enemy's reactions and, through strategy and psychological warfare, make maximum use of the forces available to him to achieve success. Historian J. B. Bury in 1923 said about the Siege of Ariminum, "when Belisarius set his mind to the problem he solved it triumphantly." Syvänne considers the breaking of the Siege of Ariminum to be a prime example of Sun Tzu's principle that "subjugating the enemy without fighting is the true pinnacle of excellence."

Despite Belisarius's military prowess, he was unable to prevent the rising tensions within the Byzantine army's networks, where authority depended more on personal loyalties. John's risky decision to act beyond orders, which brought considerable fame, posed a challenge to Belisarius's preference to keep the Goths outside Rome's walls and to achieve victory through a slow war of attrition with repeated hit-and-run tactics. These tensions were amplified by Justinian, who feared the rising popularity of Belisarius, sending Narses to inquire about the pace of the war. Narses was a senior civil official with his own network of support, but it was not enough on its own to challenge Belisarius. By aligning with John and securing the backing of commanders who opposed Belisarius, Narses had enough support to assert his authority. However, this course of action effectively fractured the Byzantine command. Bury observes that the internal divisions within the Byzantine command structure caused considerable harm that could not be compensated for by the bloodless victory at Ariminum.
