= Conon (Byzantine general) =

Byzantine military commander

- Died: 548
- Military career
- Allegiance: Byzantine Empire
- Rank: Magister utriusque militiae (vacans) (537–548)
- Conflicts: Gothic War (535–554); Siege of Rome (537–538); Siege of Naples (542–543); Sack of Rome (546)

Conon (Greek: Κόνων) was a Byzantine military commander during the Gothic War of 535 to 554 under Emperor Justinian I (r. 527–565). In 537, he was sent with reinforcements to assist general Belisarius in the defense of Rome. Later, his poor defense of Ancon was criticized by contemporary historian Procopius. He subsequently commanded the garrison of Naples during a Gothic siege in 542–543, eventually surrendering the city under negotiated terms after famine made resistance untenable.

In 546, Conon was one of Rome's garrison commanders but fled when the city fell to the Goths, amid accusations of profiteering and poor leadership. He returned to command the garrison in Rome in late 547, but was killed by his own troops around 548 following charges of corruption involving their supplies.

== Biography ==
In 537, Conon was sent from Constantinople (modern-day Istanbul) to Naples along with 3,000 Isaurians to reinforce Belisarius, then defending Rome against a numerically superior force led by the Gothic King Vitiges. Landing in Naples, he and Paulus, another Byzantine military commander, waited for additional reinforcements to gather in Naples before sailing to Ostia, the ancient port of Rome. Upon arrival, the Isaurians dug a trench to protect the port, and the supplies were delivered to Rome. Conon and the reinforcements remained in Rome to assist with its defense.

In early 538, Belisarius sent him with a force composed of Isaurians and Thracians to occupy Ancon (modern-day Ancona). Later, some of his forces were sent to reinforce the garrison at Ariminum. In mid-538, a Gothic army under Vacimus arrived at Ancon; Conon deployed his forces to face them in open battle but quickly retreated after seeing the full size of the Goths. The Goths pursued the Byzantines, killing many in the pursuit. The gates were already closed, but the garrison climbed into the city using ropes let down by its citizens. The Goth attackers attempted to storm the city using ladders, gaining a foothold on the walls, and the city was nearly lost. Ultimuth, from Belisarius's guards, and Gouboulgoudou, from Valerian's guard, who had recently arrived in the city, drove the Goths out. However, both suffered heavy wounds. Contemporary historian Procopius of Caesarea criticized Conon for leaving the defensive position behind city walls and meeting the Goths in the open.

After the fall of Ravenna in 540 AD, Belisarius restored much of Italy to Byzantine rule but was recalled by the Emperor Justinian, who needed him on the eastern front. Justinian replaced him with three commanders on equal authority whose rivalry, corruption, and the emperor's harsh fiscal policies alienated the Italian population and weakened Byzantine control. These failures enabled a Gothic resurgence first by the Gothic King Ildibad and then by his successor Totila, following the short intervening reign of Eraric. In 542, Totila defeated the Byzantine forces in open battles at Faventia and Mucellium, then advanced rapidly into southern Italy, bypassing the heavily fortified cities of the central regions. In November 542, he encircled Naples, which was defended by a 1,000-strong garrison under Conon. The city was pressed by the Goths, and Conon requested help from the other Byzantine commanders. Two Byzantine relief efforts failed to reach the city. In spring 543, with supplies cut off and famine gripping the defenders, Totila offered generous terms of safe passage in exchange for surrender. Conon accepted these terms, and the defenders departed safely while parts of the city's walls were dismantled.

In 546, Conon and Bessas were leaders of the Byzantine garrison in Rome, which at the time was besieged by the forces of Totila. Before the siege, Bessas and Conon had stockpiled large quantities of grain, which they later sold to the citizens of Rome at inflated prices. They also disregarded reports that some Isaurian guards might collaborate with the besieging Goths. Once the Goths breached the city, Conon and the other commanders fled Rome.

== Death ==
In late 547 or early 548, Conon was placed in command of the garrison forces in Rome after Belisarius left Italy for Constantinople. He was accused of trafficking and profiteering from soldiers' food supplies and was killed by his own troops in 548.

== Sources ==
- Bury, John Bagnell (1958). History of the Later Roman Empire: From the Death of Theodosius I to the Death of Justinian. Vol. 2. Mineola, New York: Dover Publications, Inc. OCLC 1240424678.
- Hughes, Ian (2009). Belisarius: the last Roman general. Yardley, Pa.: Westholme. ISBN 9781594160851. OCLC 294885267.
- Martindale, John R. (1992). The Prosopography of the Later Roman Empire 2 Part Set: Volume 3, AD 527-641. Cambridge University Press. ISBN 978-0-521-20160-5.
- Syvänne, Ilkka (2021). Military History of Late Rome 518–565. Yorkshire, PA: Pen and Sword Military. ISBN 978-1-4738-9530-0.
