= Sack of Rome (546) =

Siege of Rome during the Gothic War

Siege of Rome (546)
- Part of the Gothic War
- Main army movements during the second phase of the Gothic War
Date	Late 545 AD – 17 December 546 AD
Location	Rome, Italy 41°53′9″N 12°30′31″E
Result	Ostrogothic victory
Territorial changes	Ostrogoths captured Rome

Belligerents
Byzantine Empire	Ostrogothic Kingdom

Commanders and leaders
Bessas; Conon	Totila

Strength
3,000; Unknown number of citizens; Unknown support from Portus	Larger force

In 546, Rome was besieged for a year by the Gothic king Totila during the Gothic War between the Ostrogoths (Goths) and the Byzantine Empire.

The siege caused devastating famine inside the city, worsened by corruption among Byzantine commanders, who hoarded grain and sold it at inflated prices to Rome's citizens. Some citizens died of suicide, while others died trying to flee the city. Attempts by General Belisarius to relieve the city failed due to poor coordination and setbacks. Belisarius fell ill and withdrew his forces.

On 17 December 546, a group of Isaurian guards betrayed the city and assisted a small group of Goths in breaching the walls. The Goths opened one of the gates at night for the rest of the Gothic forces to enter Rome. Most of the inhabitants fled, leaving only a small number of civilians who sought refuge in churches. The city was then plundered. Totila planned to destroy the monuments and principal buildings of Rome, but he reconsidered after receiving a letter from Belisarius urging him to spare the city. The Goths partially dismantled Rome's walls before withdrawing, aiming to weaken its strategic value for the Byzantines to recapture it. Despite the city's desolate state, Belisarius repaired the fortifications and successfully defended the city. The siege was the first check against Totila's streak of successes during the Gothic resurgence.

== Background ==
Following the fall of Ravenna in May 540 AD, Belisarius restored Sicily and most of the Italian Peninsula to Byzantine rule. His stratagem of inducing the Goths to surrender by offering him the Western imperial crown alarmed Emperor Justinian, who recalled him to Constantinople with Ravenna's treasury and the captive king Vitiges but denied him a triumph and reassigned him to the eastern front in advance of the Lazic War (541–562). Belisarius was replaced by three coequal commanders, whose rivalry and corruption led to indiscipline and plundering of the Italian countryside. Justinian's harsh tax audit to recover alleged Gothic-era arrears, combined with reduced rewards for wounded and distinguished soldiers, further alienated troops and civilians, collapsing morale and eroding Italian loyalty.

Byzantine misrule strengthened the Goths under Ildibad, who defeated a Byzantine force at the Battle of Treviso and recovered much of the Po Valley. His reign was short-lived because he was assassinated before consolidating his power. The reign of Eraric followed, but it ended with his murder in late 541, because he secretly offered to abdicate and offer the kingdom to the Byzantines in exchange for the rank of patrician and a large payment. Through the turmoil among the Gothic aristocracy, Ildibad's nephew Totila became king. Reprimanded by Justinian for inaction to exploit Gothic disunity, the Byzantine commanders assembled to decide on a course of action. They decided to besiege Verona; however, they failed to capture Verona due to divided leadership. Totila took the initiative and pursued them and defeated a larger Byzantine army at the Battle of Faventia in spring 542. Advancing on Florence, Totila again routed Byzantine relief forces at the Battle of Mucellium. The Byzantines withdrew into fortified cities, while Totila bypassed central Italy and advanced rapidly to capture territories in southern Italy with the fall of Naples in March 543.

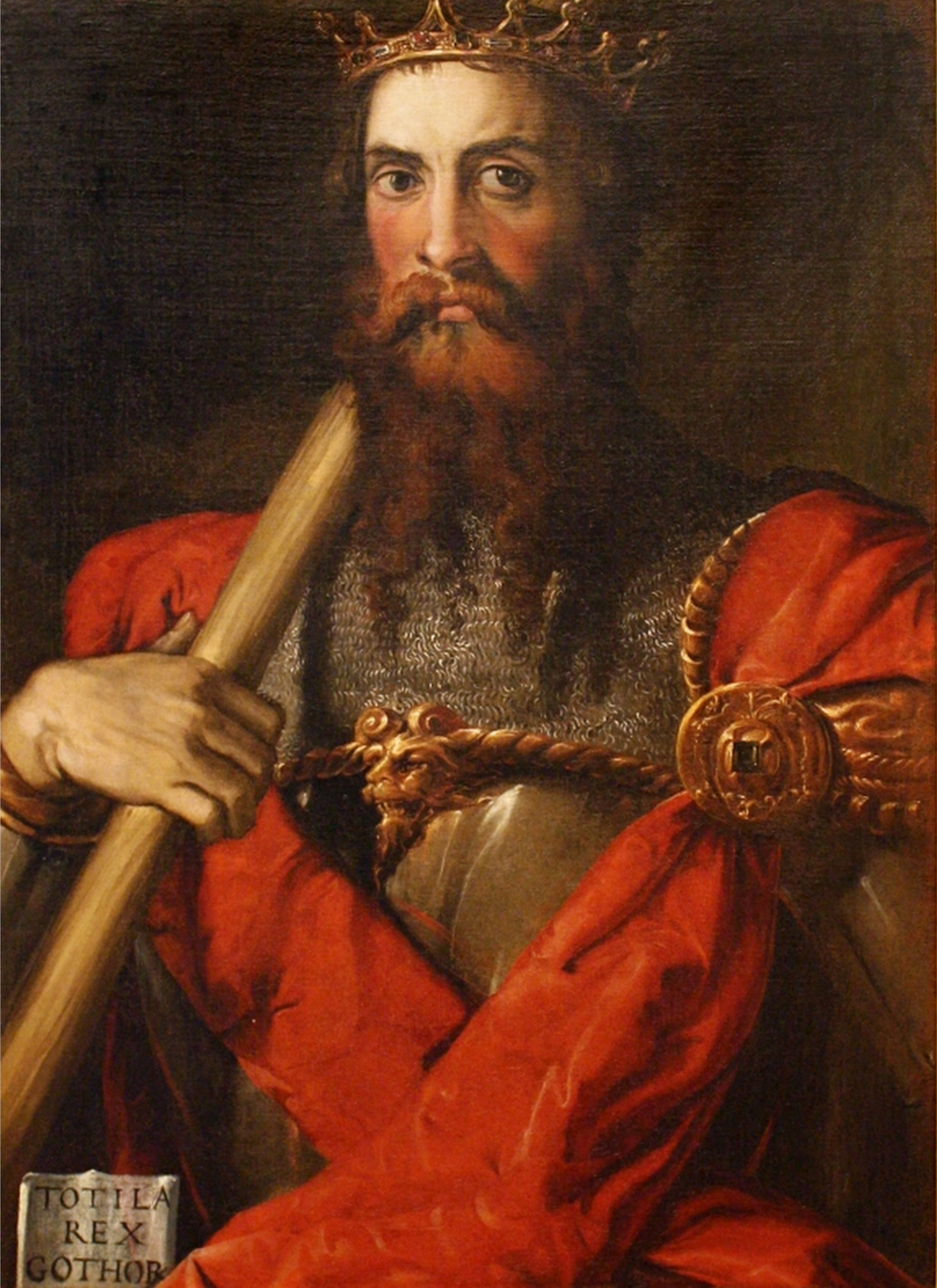
Totila by Francesco Salviati, c. 1549

Totila steadily expanded his control over Italy by combining military success with conciliatory policies toward the Italian population, presenting himself as a liberator from Byzantine exactions. In the meantime, a plague (541–549) killed one-third of the Byzantine Empire's population, weakening Byzantium's ability to field armies.

== Prelude ==
In 544, Justinian sent Belisarius to reclaim what was lost to Totila, but with little support. At Salona, Belisarius, along with Vitalius, managed to assemble 4,000 men, who had little combat experience. Justinian presumably expected that the Italian population would provide the bulk of new recruits. Belisarius reached Ravenna, where he offered pardons to deserters and wrongdoers to encourage defections and recruit new soldiers, but failed to gain sufficient support, thereby exaggerating the lack of resources. He secured nearby fortresses and took Bononia, however, he then stalled as his troops refused to fight and then deserted, driven by news of a Hunnic attack on Illyricum where the soldiers had families, unpaid wages, and shortages in Italy. Belisarius then replaced Rome's commander, John the Sanguinary, with Bessas, and sent John to Constantinople to request reinforcements, money, and supplies from Emperor Justinian.

Totila had overall the upper hand, being able to recover and maintain control of most of the countryside in the Italian Peninsula, whose farmers continued to live their lives by paying taxes to the Goths. This level of control provided him the ability to field his army over an extended period of time. When Totila learned that Belisarius was at Pola en route to Ravenna, he used a ruse to gather intelligence. He sent a forged letter to Belisarius, posing as the commander of the Byzantine garrison at Genoa. The letter was delivered by five men who had been instructed to assess the strength of Belisarius's forces. Belisarius believed the message, allowing the agents to report back that his forces were small. In the meantime, Totila captured Tibur after local inhabitants admitted the Goths during a dispute with the Isaurian guards. The Isaurians fought but were defeated, and many escaped. However, the city's civilians were massacred by the Goths. The fall of Tibur also cut off a key supply route from Tuscany to Rome. Totila continued in capturing the cities of Firmum and Asculum as he was becoming convinced that Belisarius was unable to stop him. In late 545, proceeded to encircle Rome.

== Siege ==
=== Famine and profiteering ===
The siege by the Gothic forces began in late 545 or early 546. The Byzantine commander Bessas and Conon had under their command a garrison of 3,000 soldiers, supported by a number of local citizens. The port of Portus was under Byzantine control while Ostia was occupied by the Goths. However, the sea routes to Rome were disrupted by the Gothic navy stationed in Naples and in Liparean Islands. When shipments from Sicily reached Portus, Bessas and other officers hid the bulk of the supplies in secret warehouses, and the grain was sold at inflated prices to those citizens who could afford them. Other profiteering schemes were employed; soldiers sold at inflated prices any captured oxen from outside city walls and even their own rations. The contemporary historian Procopius described the famine during the siege, in which the ordinary citizens, who were not rich enough to buy grain from the military, were reduced to eating bran, nettles, dogs, mice and "each other's dung". The famine prompted some to commit suicide. Initially, citizens were not allowed to leave, but later they could leave by paying a ransom. Many of those who left the city perished on the journey, because they were already enfeebled by famine or were killed on the road by the Goths. Bessas profited more than any other from these schemes, especially once the grain was depleted from the other officers; being the last holding the grain, he was able to sell it to the senators at extremely high prices.

=== Attempts to lift siege ===
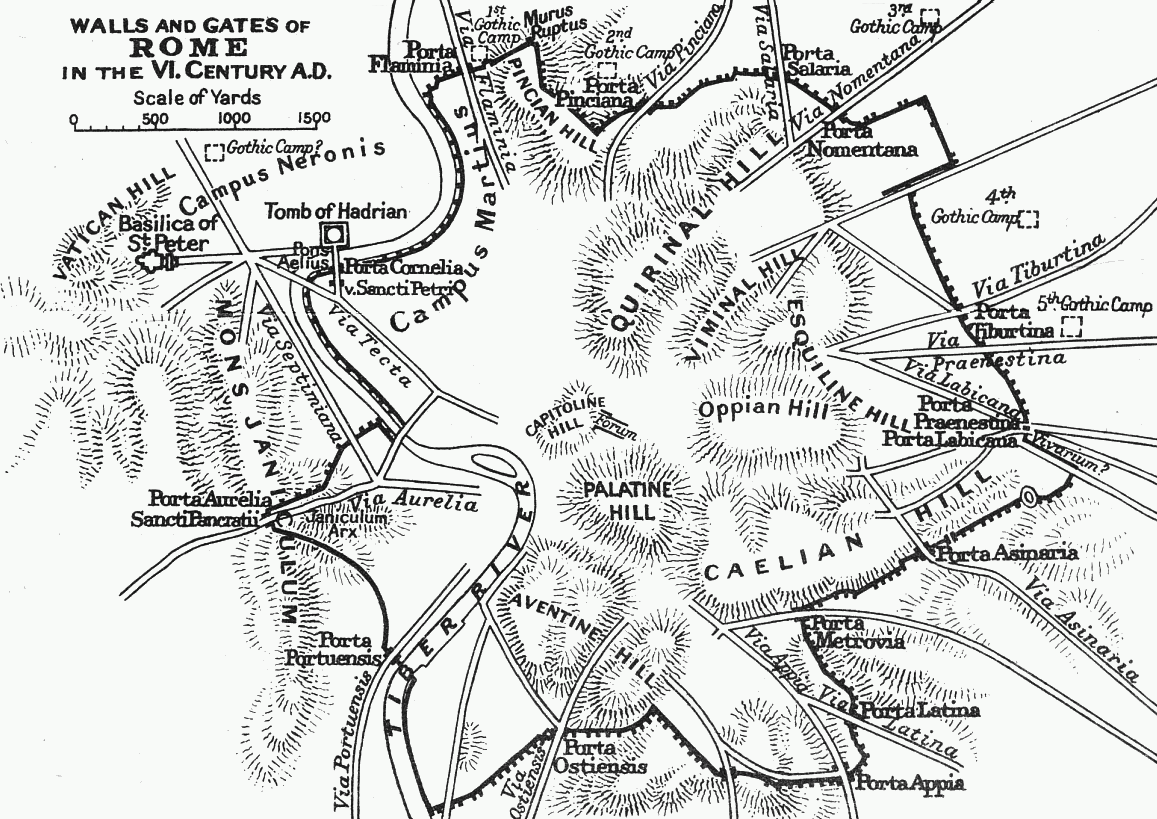
Walls and gates of Rome, 6th century. Totila and his men entered via the Porta Asinaria, in the southeast.

Aware of the worsening situation, Belisarius sent reinforcements from Epidamnus in the winter of 545/546. The force was led by Valentinus and one of his personal retainers, Phocas. They were sent to Portus, which was under the command of Innocentius, with instructions to launch sorties to harass the Goths and support the defenders in Rome. After arriving, Valentinus and Phocas asked Bessas to coordinate by attacking from the city while they struck from Portus, but Bessas refused. As a result, when the two commanders attacked the Goths with 500 cavalry, they killed only a few enemies before retreating upon realizing no support would come. A second attempt with a larger force ended in disaster after a soldier of Innocentius defected to the Goths and revealed their plans. The Goths set an ambush, killing both commanders and most of their men around March 546.

Pope Vigilius, who was the bishop of Rome and had fled to the safety of Syracuse, sent a flotilla of grain ships to feed Rome. The men of Totila spotted the cargo ships. The Goths took their ships and hid them behind the harbor walls of Portus. The local garrison saw the Gothic ships and tried to warn the approaching cargo ships by waving their cloaks. However, the crew of the cargo ships thought that this was a welcome sign. The Goths captured the whole fleet without a fight. Everyone captured was killed, except for Bishop Valentinus, who was interrogated by Totila in person, but once Totila ceased to believe Valentinus, he cut off his hands.

The army assembled by Justinian I for John and Isaac the Armenian (another Byzantine commander) reached Epidamnus in late spring 546. Its land force likely numbered at least 8,000 men, though Procopius claims it exceeded 20,000. With marines and rowers available if needed, this gave Belisarius a potential force of over 42,000 men, excluding the garrisons already stationed at Portus and Rome. A separate fleet was commanded by John and included hired barbarian troops, whose exact origins and numbers are unclear. John proposed that he and Belisarius sail to Italy and then march overland to Rome. Belisarius rejected the plan because he intended to sail directly to Rome, as its situation was urgent. On favorable winds, Rome could be reached from Epidamnus in about five days, whereas a land march would take much longer. Belisarius ordered John to land in Italy and advance through Calabria and drive out the Goths from the region. However, unfavorable winds forced Belisarius's fleet to stop at Hydruntum (modern-day Otranto), (Note: Also known as Dryus.) which was under Gothic siege. When the Goths saw the Byzantine fleet, they withdrew to Brundisium and alerted Totila. Totila then prepared his army to confront Belisarius and ordered the Gothic forces in Calabria to guard the mountain passes. Belisarius continued his journey once favorable winds returned and reached Portus.

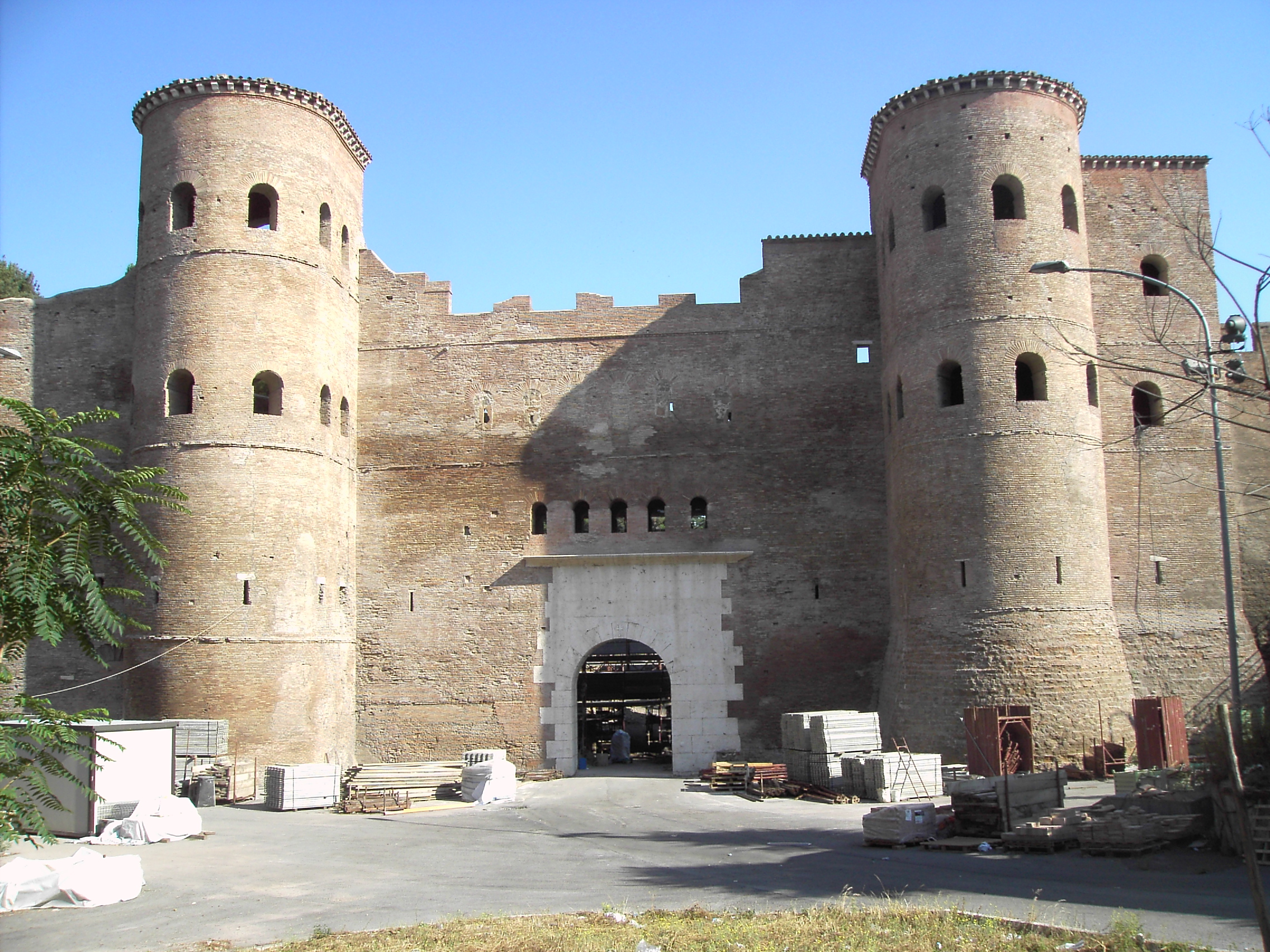
The Porta Asinaria or Asinarian Gate, through which Totila entered Rome

At Portus, Belisarius was in a difficult spot. He had too few men to challenge the Goths in open battle, while the remaining army, which included much-needed cavalry, under John, was still in southern Italy. Moreover, the Goths constructed a wooden bridge across the Tiber River at its narrowest point with wooden towers standing at both ends of the bridge, each garrisoned by 200 men. The bridge blocked passage along the river, and a heavy chain was stretched across the water in front of it, guarded by additional Goths. Belisarius decided to attack the bridge. A combination of archery and a strong infantry detachment, the Byzantines were able to remove the chain. A flaming ship was thrown on one of the towers, killing its defenders and destroying the bridge. However, Belisarius had to urgently return to Portus. Isaac, who was left to guard Portus, had taken the initiative to attack one of the Gothic camps, but he was defeated and captured. When the news reached Belisarius, he panicked, mistakenly believing that Portus had been captured and his wife had fallen into the hands of the Goths. After this, he became ill and took no further action.

=== Fall of Rome ===
Bessas's scouts had seized Goths who revealed that some Isaurian soldiers planned to betray Rome. However, he and Conon took no action. On 17 December 546, Isaurian soldiers assisted the Goths to scale the walls at night and opened the Asinarian Gate for the Gothic army to enter. Totila, fearing an ambush, kept his forces together, which provided time to the Byzantine garrison and the few senators who had horses to escape. Of the civilian population, only about 500 remained. They took refuge in churches, but sixty were killed by the Goths when Totila initially allowed his troops to plunder and kill indiscriminately. Totila later issued an order to stop the killing, though he permitted the Goths to plunder freely, reserving the most valuable treasures for himself, seizing the wealth that Bessas and the other officers had gathered. The absence of violence against women during the capture of Rome enhanced his reputation.

== Aftermath ==
As those to whom a city owes the construction of beautiful buildings are reputed wise and civilised, so those who cause their destruction are naturally regarded by posterity as persons devoid of intelligence, true to their own nature. Of all cities under the sun Rome is admitted universally to be the greatest and most important. She attained this pre-eminence not suddenly nor by the genius of one man, but in the course of a long history throughout which emperors and nobles by their vast resources and employing skilful artists from all parts of the world have gradually made her what you see her today. Her monuments belong to posterity, and an outrage committed upon them will rightly be regarded as a great injustice to all future generations as well as to the memory of those who created them. Therefore consider well. Should you be victorious in this war, Rome destroyed will be your own loss, preserved it will be your fairest possession. Should it be your fortune to be defeated, the conqueror will owe you gratitude if you spare Rome, whereas if you demolish it, there will be no reason for clemency, while the act itself will have brought you no profit. And remember that your reputation in the eyes of the world is at stake.

— Belisarius's letter to Totila pleading him not to destroy Rome.

Totila hoped that the capture of Rome would bring an end to the war. According to historian JB Bury, Totila intended to restore the constitutional order that existed under Theoderic in which the Byzantine authority remained nominally supreme rather than creating an independent kingdom. He instructed his envoys to make it clear that if Justinian refused peace, he would raze Rome to the ground and invade Illyricum. However, Justinian dismissed the envoys, stating that Belisarius was the person in charge of the war. Totila tore down about one third of the defensive walls and removed the gates to prevent the Byzantines from recapturing the city, as he did not wish to garrison a force, before leaving in pursuit of Byzantine forces in Apulia. He was also about to proceed in destroying principal buildings and monuments, when he received a letter from Belisarius, who was recovering in Portus, in which he pleaded with him to spare the city. According to Procopius, Totila intended to turn Rome into a "sheep-pasture". After consideration, Totila ceased the destruction of Rome.

After the bulk of the Gothic army marched south against territories John had captured, Belisarius defeated a small force left behind by Totila and occupied Rome, which was in a desolate state. In the spring of 547 and within a period of four weeks, the Byzantines were able to bring people from the surrounding areas to populate the city, hastily rebuilding the demolished sections of the wall by piling up the stones regardless of order. The gates had not been fixed when Totila returned, so Belisarius placed his best men to block entry. For several days, the Goths attempted to breach through the gates, but they were repelled. The turning point came with the death of Totila's standard-bearer, who fell from his horse and dropped the standard. The Byzantines at the front charged to seize it. In the struggle that followed, the Goths recovered the standard, but then retreated in defeat and pursued for a long distance. Despite the victory, Belisarius remained inactive and was then recalled from Italy. In 549, Totila advanced for a third time against Rome, which he took after another long siege.
