= Scipuar =

Commander of the Ostrogoths

Scipuar (Greek: Σκιποῦαρ, fl. ca. 551–552) was a commander of the Ostrogoths in the final stages of the Gothic War against the Eastern Roman Empire.

Procopius mentions Scipuar along with Gibal and Indulf (Gundulf) as "the most notable among the Goths." Together with the other two he was appointed commander by Totila and ordered to capture Ancona in Picenum. While Gibal and Indulf assumed command of naval forces, Scipuar led the siege of the city. After Gibal and Indulf suffered a crushing defeat at the Battle of Sena Gallica in the fall of 551, Scipuar's army retreated from Ancona to Auximum, enabling the Byzantine commander Valerian to assume control of the city.

Scipuar fought side by side with Totila at the disastrous Battle of Taginae in 552. Along with other four men, he accompanied Totila during his flight from the battlefield. A party of Roman soldiers pursued them and caught up with them, killing Totila. Scipuar managed to wound Totila's killer Asbadus, but was wounded in turn. The Romans then gave up the pursuit and left them alone. Nothing further is known of Scipuar thereafter.

== Sources ==
- Dewing, Henry Bronson, ed. (1962) [1928]. Procopius, with an English translation by H.B. Dewing, in Seven Volumes. Vol. V: History of the Wars, Books VII [continued] and VIII. The Loeb Classical Library. William Heinemann Ltd. (London) & Harvard University Press (Cambridge, Mass.).
- Martindale, John Robert; Jones, Arnold Hugh Martin; Morris, J., eds. (1992). The Prosopography of the Later Roman Empire, Volume III: A.D. 527–641. Cambridge: Cambridge University Press. ISBN 978-0-521-20160-5.
