= Siege of Naples (542–543) =

Siege during Justinian's Gothic War

- Part of the Gothic War
- Main army movements during the second phase of the Gothic War
| Date | November 542 – March/April 543 AD |
| Location | Naples, Italy |
| Result | Ostrogothic victory |
| Territorial changes | Goths captured Naples |

Belligerents
| Byzantine Empire | Ostrogothic Kingdom |

Commanders and leaders
| Conon (surrendered) | Totila |

Strength
| 1,000 men | Unknown |

The Siege of Naples, also known as the siege of Neapolis, took place in 542–543 AD (Note: Some books report the date 543–544 AD.) during the Gothic War (535–554) when the Ostrogoths (Goths) captured it from the Byzantine Empire.

After the fall of Ravenna in 540 AD, Belisarius restored much of Italy to Byzantine rule but was recalled by the Byzantine Emperor Justinian, who distrusted his actions and needed him on the eastern front. Justinian replaced him with three commanders on equal authority whose rivalry and corruption, together with the emperor's harsh fiscal policies, alienated the Italian population and weakened Byzantine control. These failures enabled the Gothic king Ildibad to regain territory in northern Italy before his assassination, after which his successor Eraric briefly ruled and was himself murdered in 541. Eraric's death brought Totila, the nephew of Ildibad, to the Gothic throne, and Byzantine inaction and poor leadership allowed him to seize the initiative.

Totila defeated Byzantine forces at Faventia and Mucellium, then advanced rapidly into southern Italy while bypassing the heavily fortified cities of the central regions. In November 542, he encircled Naples, which was defended by a 1000-strong garrison under Conon. Two Byzantine relief efforts failed to reach the city. With supplies cut off and famine gripping the defenders, Totila offered generous terms of safe passage in exchange for surrender. Conon accepted these terms in March or April 543, and the defenders departed safely while parts of the city's walls were dismantled. The capture of Naples, as well as surrounding cities, marked a significant step for the Goths in their recovery of the Italian Peninsula from the Byzantines.

== Background ==
Following the fall of Ravenna, the capital of the Gothic kingdom, in May 540 AD, Belisarius had succeeded in restoring former Western Roman territories (Sicily and most of the Italian Peninsula) to Byzantine rule. However, the Goths had offered Belisarius the Western Roman imperial crown, which spooked Byzantine Emperor Justinian. Although Belisarius returned to Constantinople in mid-summer 540 with Ravenna's treasury and the defeated Gothic King Vitiges as prisoner, Justinian refused him a triumph. The general's departure was also needed on the eastern front against the Persians in the upcoming Lazic War (541–562).

Justinian replaced Belisarius with three commanders of equal authority—Bessas, John the Sanguinary, and Constantinianus. The three commanders fell into rivalry and turned to plundering the Italian population instead of fighting the remaining Goths. The situation deteriorated further when Justinian imposed a severe tax audit, compelling Italians to pay alleged arrears dating from Gothic rule, while simultaneously reducing soldiers' rewards for wounds and acts of bravery. These policies were implemented by Alexander, an auditor known as "the Snips" (Ancient Greek: Ψαλίδιος, Psalídios) for cutting off the edges around gold coins to enrich himself and the emperor favored him for being able to save significant state expenses. This climate of lawlessness undermined discipline, alienated the troops, and rapidly destroyed Italian loyalty to the empire.

Belisarius's withdrawal from Italy also encouraged the newly crowned Gothic king, Ildibad, whose cause was strengthened by Byzantine abuses. A Byzantine army was defeated at Treviso by Ildibad, enabling the Goths to regain control of much of the Po Valley. His success, however, was short-lived, as he was assassinated before he could consolidate power. Unable to agree on a suitable candidate from among themselves, the Goths accepted Eraric, who belonged to a tribe distinct from the Goths, as their ruler. Eraric convened a council and secured Gothic approval to send an embassy to Constantinople to negotiate peace on the same terms previously offered to Vitigis before the fall of Ravenna. Privately, however, he dispatched his own agents and instructed them to inform Justinian that, in exchange for the rank of patrician and a substantial payment, he would abdicate and surrender northern Italy to the empire. In late 541, Eraric was assassinated, and Ildibad's nephew, Totila, succeeded him as king.

== Prelude ==
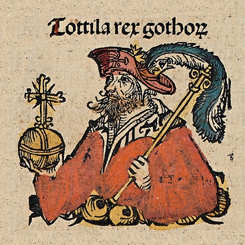
Totila in the Nuremberg Chronicle, 1493

Following the murder of Gothic King Eraric, Justinian realized that the Goths were paralyzed by internal dissensions and his Byzantine commanders stationed in Italy had not done anything to take advantage of the situation. He sent a letter reprimanding them for their inactivity and demanded action. The Byzantine commanders Bessas, John, and Cyprian gathered in Ravenna, where Constantianus and Alexander were stationed, to debate their course of action. It was decided for a 12,000-strong army, having eleven commanders with two at the top of the command, Constantinianus and Alexander, to take Verona. However, the failed siege of that city signaled to the newly crowned king of the Goths, Totila, to take the initiative while the Byzantines remained under poor leadership. This led to the Battle of Faventia in spring 542, where Totila, commanding an army of about 5,000 men, pursued and defeated the Byzantine army.

Following his success against the Byzantines, Totila sent part of his troops to attack Florence. Justin, the Byzantine commander of Florence, had neglected to adequately provision the city against a siege since he was not expecting an attack, and hurriedly sent for aid to the other Byzantine commanders in the area: John, Bessas, and Cyprian. They gathered their forces and came to the relief of Florence. At the Battle of Mucellium, Totila defeated the Byzantine forces, which scattered and returned behind walls for protection. Totila did not attempt the conquest of central Italy, where the Byzantines controlled large well-fortified cities. Instead, he advanced rapidly through southern Italy. The Byzantine generals and the remaining troops fled to isolated strongholds (Bessas to Spoleto, Justin back to Florence, Cyprian to Perugia, and John to Rome), where they made preparations against a potential siege as they did not want to meet the Goths in the open. From that point onward, they failed to coordinate their efforts against the Goths, leading to the prolongation of the war. (Note: Historian Ian Hughes argued that a contributing factor to the fractured Byzantine leadership was the 542 plague on the Italian Peninsula, as the commanders remained in place to avoid catching the plague.)

== Military actions ==
=== Siege and conquest of South of Italy ===
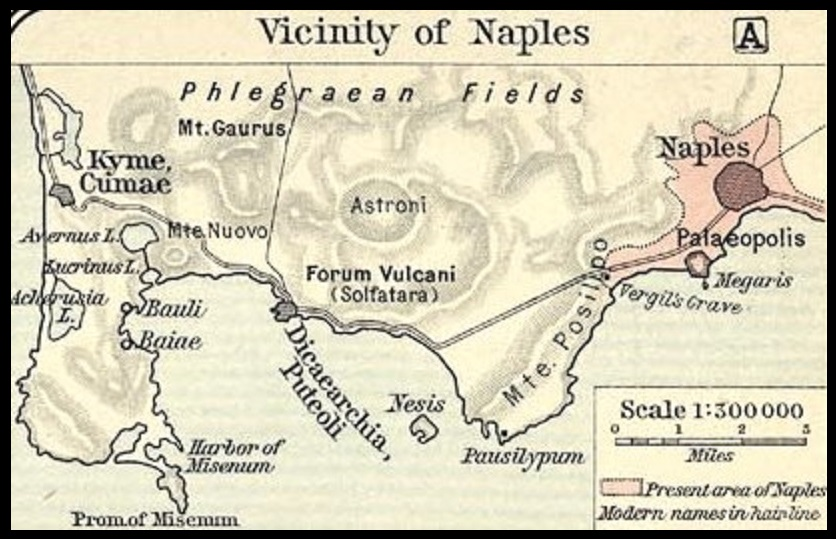
Ancient sites in the vicinity of Naples

In November 542, Totila marched to Naples and established a camp near the city walls. He chose to blockade Naples by land and sea rather than launch an immediate assault. The city's inhabitants prepared to resist him, supported by a garrison of one thousand soldiers under the command of commander Conon.

Being unopposed by the Byzantines, Totila dispatched detachments to subdue the rest of southern Italy while waiting for the surrender of Naples. Cumae and several other strongholds fell in southern Italy. Among the spoils were the senators' wives, who were released, hoping to win the senators' goodwill for his side. His forces also overran the regions of the Brutii, Lucania, Apulia, and Calabria with little resistance. Much of the public taxation and estate revenues in these territories came under the control of Totila. As a result, it effectively paralyzed the Byzantine army in Italy, as its soldiers were deprived of their regular pay.

=== Attempts to lift siege ===
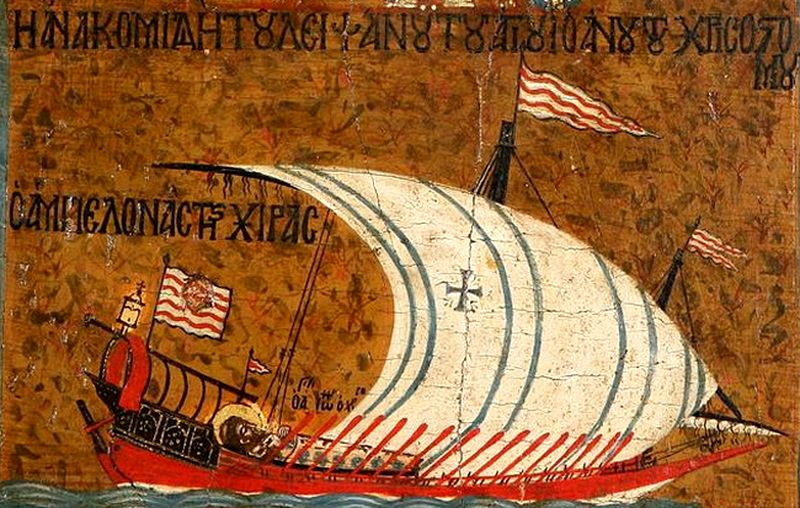
14th-century painting of a light galley, from an icon now at the Byzantine and Christian Museum at Athens

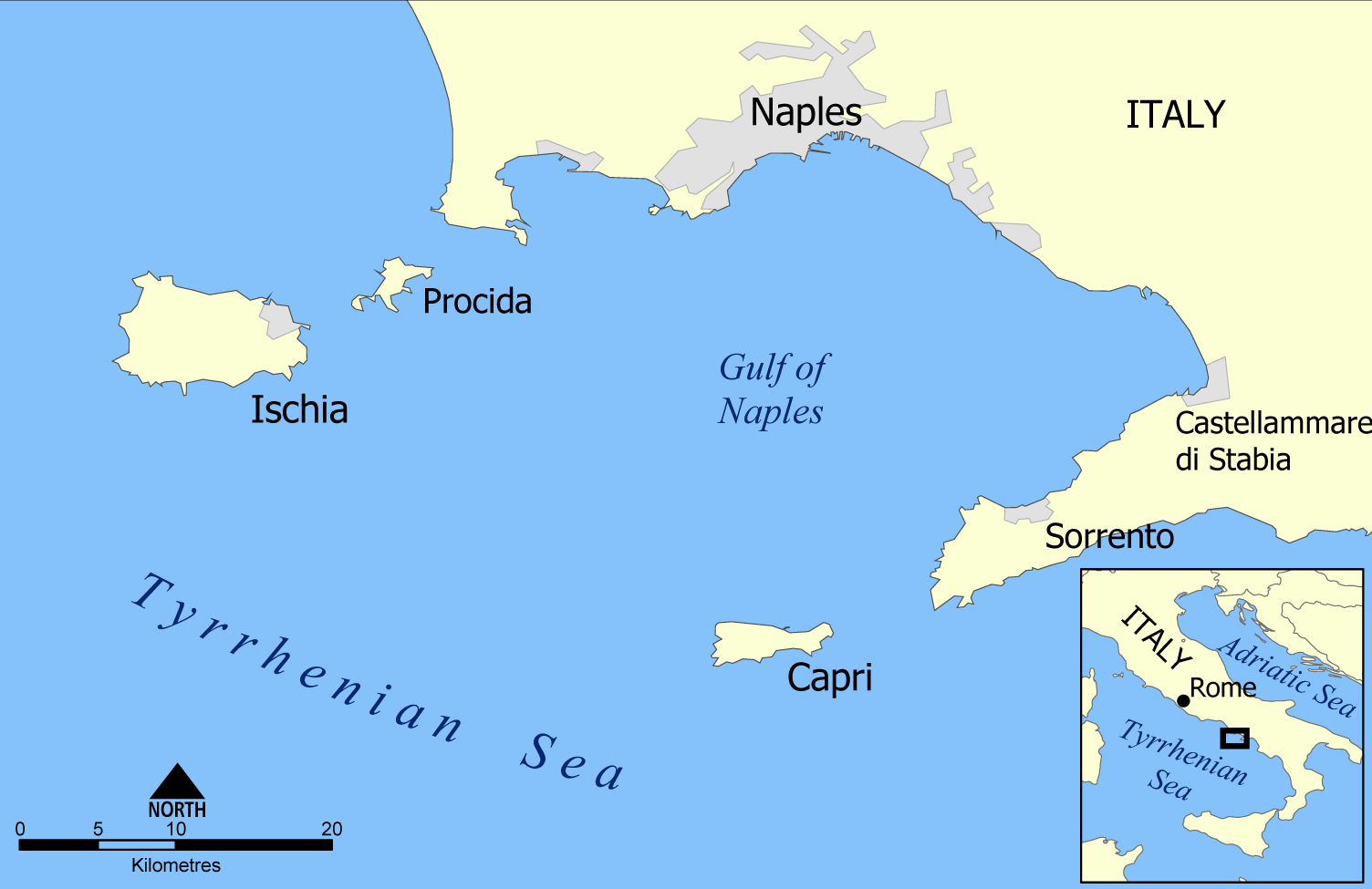
Regional map of the Gulf of Naples

The emperor became alarmed by the setbacks in Italy and the prospect of losing Naples, Justinian sent the civilian Maximin to be Praetorian Prefect of Italy, but Maximin's indecision left him unable to formulate an effective strategy against the Goths. Maximin and his army stayed for some time in Epirus, as Maximin did not want to cross the Adriatic sea in November. After Maximin, magister militum (strategos) Demetrius, an officer who had formally served under Belisarius, was sent from Constantinople to Italy. Demetrius sailed to Sicily, where he hired merchantmen and cargo ships filled with provisions to penetrate the Gothic naval blockade and revictualling Naples. Instead of sailing directly to Naples, he traveled to Rome to recruit additional soldiers. However, Demetrius was unable to enlist any, as the soldiers there were demoralized and had not gotten their salaries.

Totila was informed of Demetrius's presence in Rome and the purpose of his trip, prompting him to assemble a fleet of agile light ships that had the advantage over merchant ships. The relief force was intercepted by Gothic ships and largely captured before reaching the city. Some of the soldiers were slain, while others escaped, including Demetrius. In the meantime, Maximin had reached Syracuse. Maximin was under pressure from the other officers in Italy to act. In the end, he sent the whole armament under the leadership of Demetrius, Herodian, and Phazas, while he remained in Syracuse. The second attempt also failed when adverse winter winds drove the fleet ashore in the Gulf of Naples, where the Byzantines were overrun by Totila's forces at the coast. Herodian and Phazas escaped with their ships, but Demetrius was captured by the Goths.

=== Parley and surrender ===
Totila ordered Demetrius to be put in chains and taken to the gates of Naples, where he was compelled to address the citizens under Totila's dictation. Totila offered generous terms, reminding the citizens of Naples that their emperor had been powerless to protect them, especially since much of the armament sent by reinforcements had fallen into his hands. Confident in his position, Totila gave the citizens three months to deliberate on his offer. With the garrison weakened by famine and the collapse of the relief efforts, Conon accepted these terms in late March or early April 543 (before the three months ended).

== Aftermath ==
Totila kept the terms of the agreement by feeding the citizens of Naples and letting the soldiers leave in any direction they wished. However, portions of the city walls were dismantled. He also distributed food among the citizens of Naples, by increasing their rations only gradually to prevent them from harming themselves. He also executed one of his bodyguards for forcing himself upon a local girl. His generous approach in winning the hearts and minds of the Byzantine citizens of the Italian Peninsula was effective. Soon, Byzantine officers sent letters to Justinian, saying that the attempt to reclaim Italy had failed because they were unable to rally support to counter Totila, and they asked to be relieved of duty. In the meantime, Totila dispatched letters to senators offering pardons if they switched side to the Goths. When the Byzantine officials in Rome discovered this, they tried to intercept the correspondence, but the letters soon became public knowledge. A fraction of the population started to view the Goths as liberators. Then, Totila advanced to besiege Rome in spring 544. Upon receiving this news, Justinian recalled Belisarius from the eastern front where he commanded a Byzantine force against Persia and dispatched him to Italy.
