= Siege of Auximus =

Siege during Justinian's Gothic War

- Part of the Gothic War (535–554)
- First five years of Belisarius's campaigns in Italy
Date	April/May – November/December 539 AD
Location	Auximus (present-day Osimo), Italy
Result	Byzantine victory
Territorial changes	Auximus captured by the Byzantines

Belligerents
Byzantine Empire	Ostrogothic kingdom

Commanders and leaders
Belisarius	Visandus (Note: Both Visandus and Vasimus were Goth commanders, who Vitigis sent to defend Auximus against the Byzantines. Historian Patrick Amory notes that neither is mentioned by Procopius at the end of the siege, suggesting that they may have perished during the siege.); Vasimus

Strength
11,000	10,000

The siege of Auximus (also called siege of Auximum or siege of Osimo) took place in 539 AD, where the Byzantines seized control of Auximus (present-day Osimo) from Ostrogoths (Goths), during the Gothic War (535–554).

The leader of Byzantine forces, Belisarius, chose to surround and starve the defenders rather than assault the fortifications of Auximus. The Byzantine troops encircled the town, cutting it off from supplies. The Goths made attempts to forage beyond the walls to stave off starvation and repel Byzantine attacks. They also continued to hope for relief from their king, Vitigis, who promised in a secret communication to do so. After seven months of siege and their king's inaction, the Gothic garrison agreed to surrender, retaining half of their possessions and joining the Byzantine army. The capture of Auximus enabled the Byzantines to advance against the Gothic capital of Ravenna, which fell soon after, marking the completion of the first phase of the Gothic War.

== Prelude ==
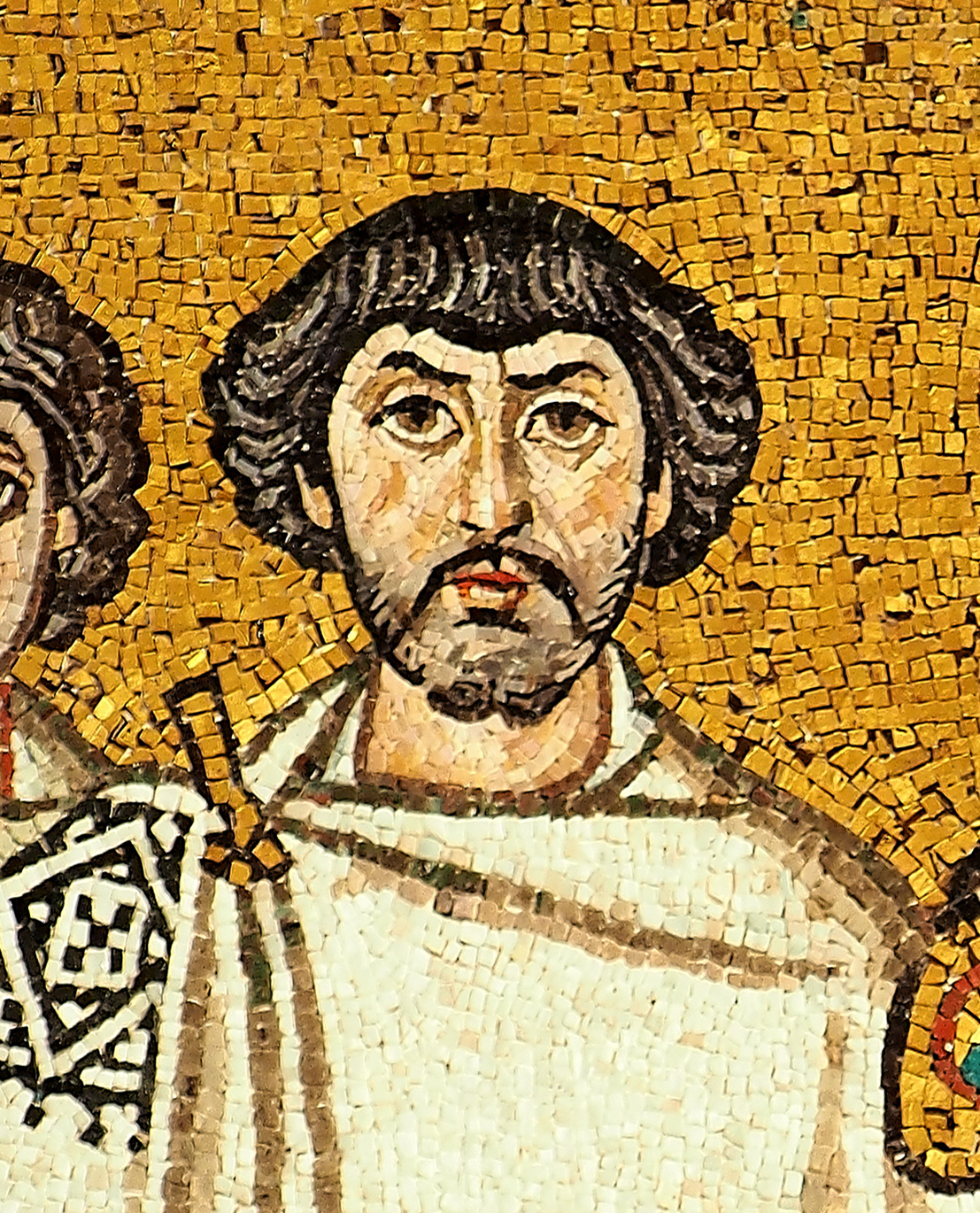
Mosaic, 6th century, depicting Belisarius, from the Basilica of San Vitale, Ravenna, Italy

In 535 AD, the Byzantine Emperor Justinian launched a campaign to liberate the Italian cities that were under the control of the Ostrogothic Kingdom. The commanders Belisarius, Mundus and Constantinianus had made swift gains, conquering Sicily and then the southern Italian Peninsula, and the regions of Dalmatia and Liburnia located on the Balkan Peninsula and across Italy.

The Goths and their allies moved against the Byzantines in Rome with superior numbers in March 537. The siege took about a year, during which the superior numbers of the Goths were insufficient to break the Byzantine defenses. Belisarius sent a cavalry detachment under John the Sanguinary to raid the region of Picenum, where John captured Ariminum. The Gothic King Vitigis abandoned the siege of Rome and moved to retake Ariminum, due to the town's strategic importance being a day's march from Ravenna, the Gothic capital. (Note: The distance corresponds to approximately 50 km (31 mi).) Along the way, he reinforced various Gothic outposts, including Auximus with an additional 4,000 men under Visandus, resulting in an overall 10,000-strong garrison. Vitigis also sent Vasimus, another Gothic commander, to Auximus. Belisarius sent infantry to station in Ariminum and ordered John to leave the city. John refused to obey, and soon the Goths besieged the city, trapping John inside. At Firmum, Belisarius joined forces with Narses, who had arrived with reinforcements from Constantinople. The Byzantine commanders debated whether to save John. Narses appealed to Belisarius to save him, claiming that losing John and Ariminum would boost the Goths' morale. Eventually, Belisarius agreed.

Even with Narses's reinforcements, Belisarius wanted to avoid a battle with the numerically superior Gothic forces, and devised a plan that took into account psychological warfare. He divided his forces into three detachments and advanced on Ariminum from different directions, deliberately leaving one escape route open. Additional campfires were lit to exaggerate the size of the Byzantine army. Alarmed by what they believed to be a massive force, the Goths withdrew toward Ravenna, and in July 538, Belisarius entered the town. After the victory, John refused to acknowledge Belisarius and instead credited Narses, who had convinced Belisarius to intervene. From this point on, Narses and John challenged Belisarius's leadership and began to act independently of his command. This leadership division caused delays for relief forces to arrive at Mediolanum (now Milan) during the Gothic siege, resulting in the city's destruction and the massacre of its population in March 539. As a result of this disaster, Narses was called back to Constantinople, while Belisarius, being the sole commander-in-chief of the Byzantine forces in Italy, prepared a campaign to capture Ravenna.

Auximus, a well-fortified hilltop town, guarded the approach to Ravenna. It stood approximately 275 m (902 ft) above sea level and about 15 km (9.3 mi) from the sea. Belisarius prepared a force of 11,000 troops, and his army would be protected at the rear by the garrison of Ariminum. At the same time, Belisarius sent a detachment of infantry under Cyprian and Justinus to besiege Fiesole; the Byzantine forces encamped close to the city to starve out the Goths. He also sent Martinus and John to Dertona (modern-day Tortona) to protect the besieging forces at Fiesole from the Goths at Milan, which were under the command of Uraias.

The Byzantines were well-supplied with food and provisions coming by ship from Sicily and Calabria, much of which was stored at Ancon. The Gothic army at Ravenna was immobilized by supply shortages following the devastation of the lands in Picenum.

== Military and diplomatic actions ==
=== Siege ===
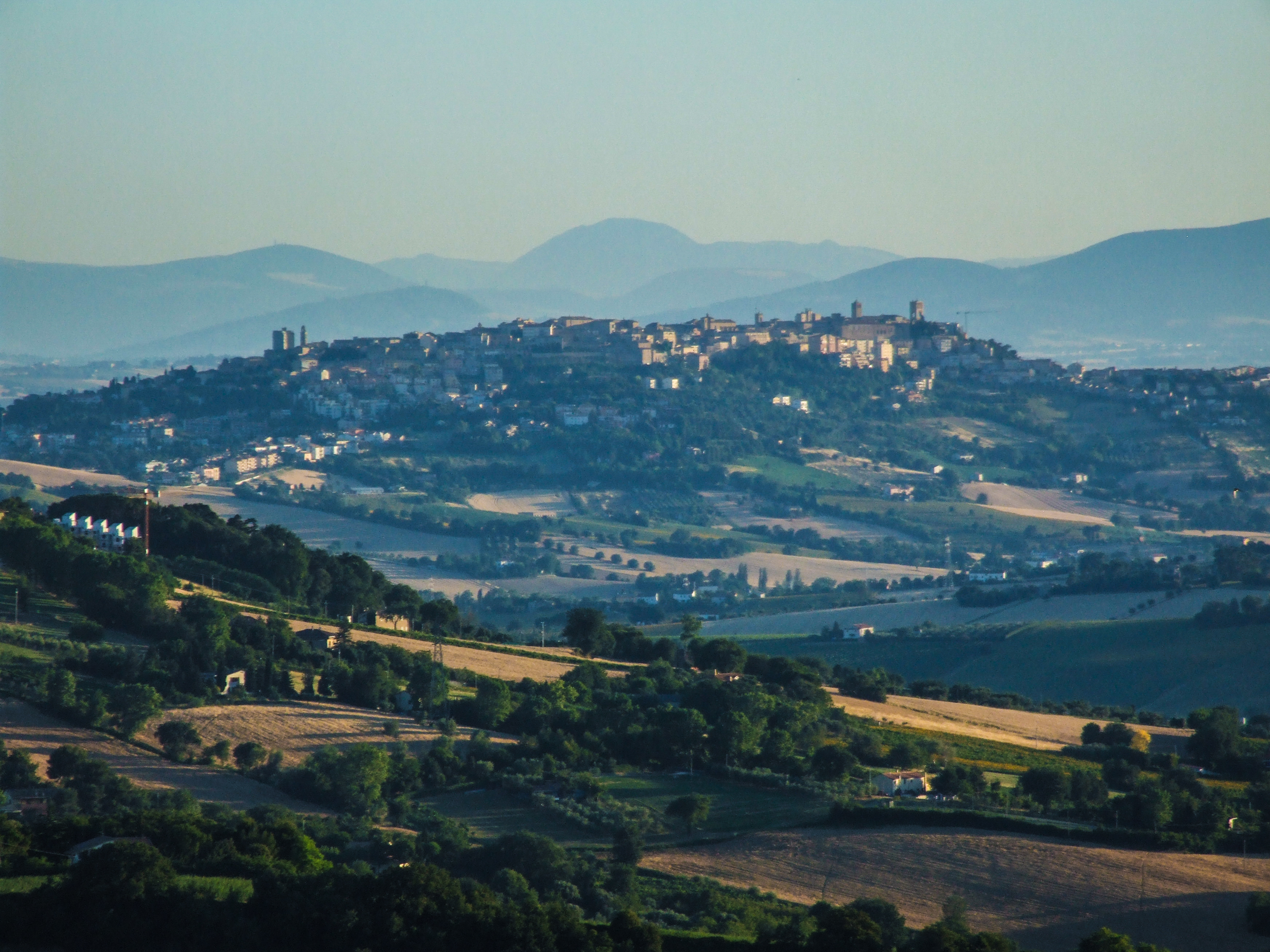
Photo of modern-day Osimo, capturing the topography of the region

In May or April of 539 AD, Belisarius reached Auximus, and judging the garrison strength and the fortifications, he decided against a direct assault but instead sought to starve out the defenders. The Byzantines began encircling Auximus by building camps around it. The Goths noticed that the camps were too far from each other for the Byzantines to send reinforcements to a camp under attack, making them vulnerable to hit-and-run tactics. The Goths sallied out from the east side of the city, where Belisarius was still engaged in making camp, in the late afternoon and attacked one of the camps. After heavy fighting with casualties on both sides, the Goths were forced back into the city.

The Goths were surprised by the speed of the Byzantine advance to Auximus and were short of food. Every day, the Goths would leave the safety of the city to get grass for the horses and herbs for the men. The Byzantine troops attempted to prevent this from happening. The Goths tried to use countermeasures by employing ambushes. Auximus was on a hill cut by ravines and forests. They sent out the foraging party to places close to the walls to gather forage, and once the Byzantine troops attacked the foraging party, they attacked the Byzantines from the rear. Once the Byzantines retreated, the Goths continued foraging without any disturbances. The ambushes succeeded because, when a Byzantine detachment attacked the foraging party (lured into the ambush), those left behind could see the Goths encircling the Byzantines, but they were unable to warn their comrades due to the distance between them and the loud noise raised by the Goths. According to Procopius, he told Belisarius that the Romans used a trumpet (salpinx) with two strains to direct troops to advance forward or retreat. While this skill was forgotten, he suggested to Belisarius that cavalry trumpets be used to signal an attack, while infantry trumpets, which produced a different sound, be used to signal a retreat. Belisarius accepted this proposal, and it allowed the Byzantines to keep attacking the foraging parties without being ambushed.

=== Empire under attack ===
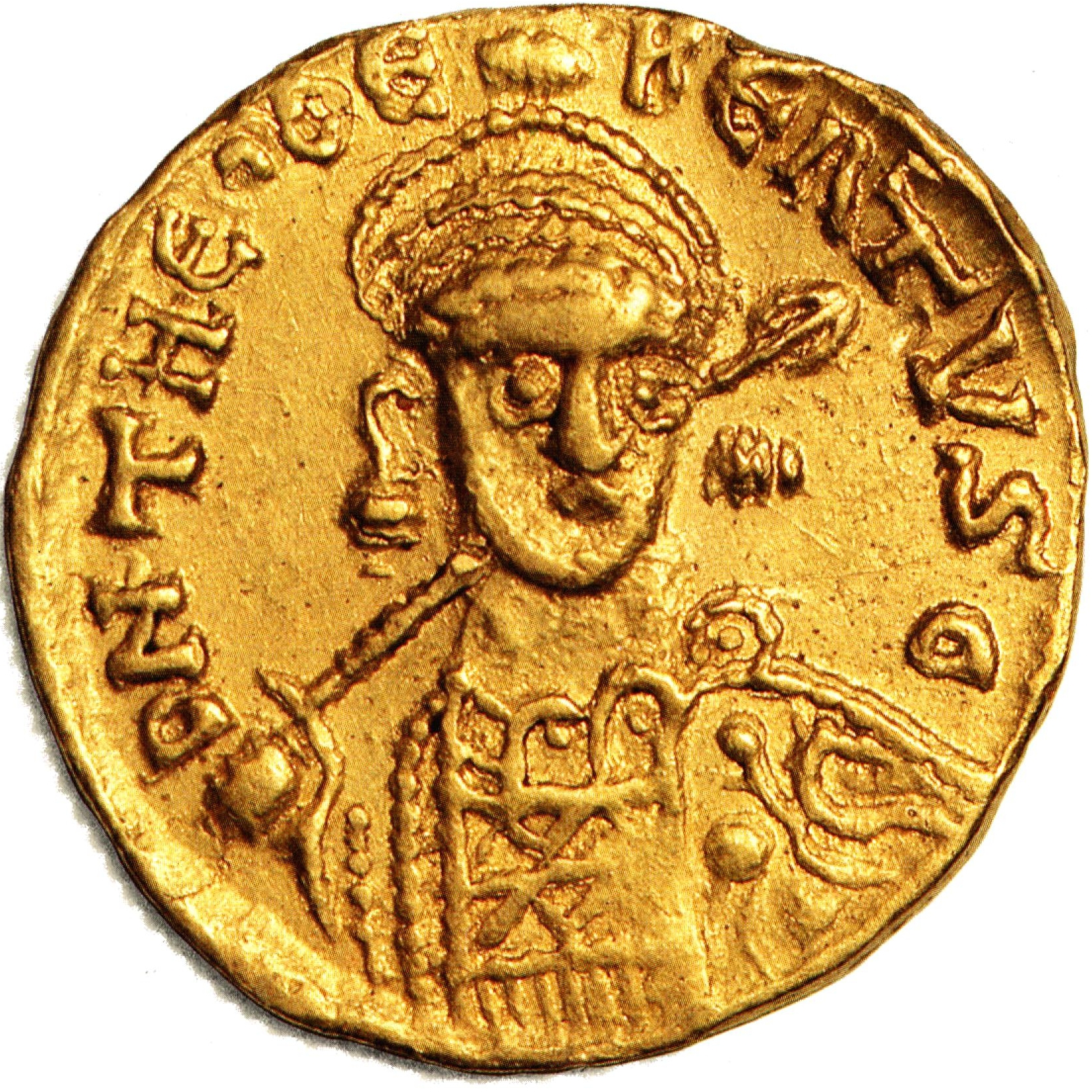
A coin depicting Theudebert I, the Frankish king who invaded Italy

During the siege of Auximus, the Goths under Uraias advanced to Ticinum (now Pavia) and faced the Byzantine forces of Martinus and John across the river Po. The Franks led by Theudebert I invaded Italy with a 100,000-strong army from the Alps. They attacked the Goths and the Byzantines. The Goths suffered far more from these attacks than the Byzantines. Eventually, the Franks retreated after a communication by Belisarius, a supply shortage, and disease (diarrhea and dysentery) killing a third of the army. The brief Frankish invasion did not affect the siege of Auximus. On the Balkan Peninsula, the Huns invaded the Byzantine Empire, reaching Constantinople before retreating. A second invasion by the Huns occurred shortly afterwards, bypassing Byzantine defenses, leading to the plundering of Greece, except for the Peloponnese.

In early 539, Vitigis was considering asking for help. Initially, he asked Wacho, the king of Langobardians. Wacho refused him because he was allied with Justinian and did not want to spoil his reputation by breaking the alliance. Then the Goths considered asking Khosrow I, the Persian leader (shah), with the reasoning that the Byzantines would not be able to continue campaigning in Italy while having an open front in the east. They paid two Ligurian priests to deliver a letter to Khosrow by passing through the Byzantine territories without detection. Khosrow received the letter with interest, since he viewed Belisarius's conquests in Italy with concern.

Before the arrival of the priests, Khosrow sought a pretext for war and encouraged his ally Al-Mundhir of the Lakhmids to provide one. Al-Mundhir accused Al-Harith ibn Jabalah, leader of the Byzantine-allied Ghassanids, of violating his territory and invaded the disputed region of Strata, south of Palmyra, claiming he was not bound by the treaty since he was not named in the treaty. However, Procopius noted that allied Arab groups were traditionally included in Roman–Persian treaties. Justinian sent Strategius, who advised him to abandon claims to Strata to avoid war, as an envoy to Al-Mundhir. Khosrow alleged that the envoy aimed to undermine his alliance with Al-Mundhir and accused Justinian of inciting the Huns against Persia. Despite Justinian's denials, Khosrow, having received the two priests from Italy, canceled the treaty and prepared for the Lazic war (541–562). Justinian learned about the communication between the Goths and Persians and recognized the perils of fighting on two fronts. The Byzantines tried to make peace with the Goths. For Justinian, the Persians posed a more dire threat than the Goths and peace in Italy would free Belisarius to take command on the eastern front.

=== Secret correspondence with Vitigis ===
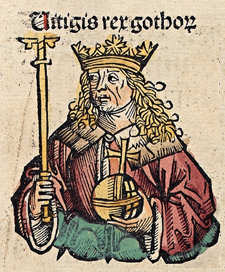
Vitigis in the Nuremberg Chronicle, 1493

As food shortages at Auximus became more acute, the defenders requested help from their king. They created a diversion by loudly shouting from different parts of the city walls under a moonless night. Belisarius ordered his troops to be on alert to stay in their camps for a possible Gothic stratagem. This diversion allowed the Gothic envoy to break through the Byzantine camps and reach Vitigis. The Gothic king promised to assist in providing relief to the garrison. He failed to do so due to a lack of supplies for an expeditionary campaign and the dangers of placing an army between Belisarius and the Byzantine garrison at Ariminum. Belisarius, upon learning from deserters that Goths had communicated with their king, ordered more vigilance to prevent any further communication. The Gothic garrison, having not seen action by their king, bribed a Byzantine soldier named Bercentius (possibly a Visigoth) to renew their plea. Bercentius carried the letter to Ravenna and delivered it to Vitigis. The Gothic king again promised to send a relief force.

Belisarius sought to understand why the Goths at Auximus resisted that long without surrendering. He ordered his troops to capture and question a Goth. A Byzantine Slav soldier, a specialist in capturing prisoners, brought a prisoner who disclosed the identity of the messenger. Belisarius handed the traitor over to his comrades for punishment, who burned him alive.

=== Battle over the water supply ===
Belisarius increased the pressure by attempting to divert the only (underground) spring supplying the city with fresh water, which was located outside the walls. A testudo formation was used to bring five Isaurians skilled in masonry to the spring. The Goths noticed the Byzantines' goal, and they rained down projectiles onto them. In a desperate move, the Goths launched a sortie, but the Byzantines counter-attacked, leading to a melee involving pushing and shoving. The Goths had the upper hand due to their position, but the Byzantines held their ground with Belisarius encouraging them from behind. During the battle, Belisarius was saved when a bodyguard blocked an incoming arrow with his right hand. The Byzantines suffered considerable losses until seven men broke through the Gothic lines. The Byzantines advanced through the gap and routed the Goths. The Byzantines retreated to their camps after the long engagement. The Isaurians also retreated because they failed to divert the water supply. Belisarius ordered dead animals, herbs, and quicklime to be placed in the water stream to poison the water, forcing the inhabitants of Auximus to use the well inside the fort.

=== Negotiations and surrender ===
The famine in Fiesole forced its inhabitants to negotiate with Cyprian and Justinus. The Byzantine army moved to reinforce Belisarius at Auximus. The prisoners from Fiesole were paraded outside the city, resulting in the Goths initiating negotiations with Belisarius. The demand by the Goths was to leave for Ravenna with all their belongings. The latter was contrary to the expectations of the Byzantine troops, who demanded plunder. Belisarius rejected this as he wanted to capture Ravenna, and he did not want to face these troops again, who had fought valiantly. He also needed to take Auximus to secure his rear once he moved against Ravenna. This attack should take place before the Franks returned. A compromise was reached whereby half of the garrison's property would be rewarded to the Byzantine troops, with the Goths keeping the rest and joining the Byzantine army. The Goths agreed, thus ending the siege in October or November 539. (Note: This is in contrast to the Goths of Fiesole, who surrendered to keep their lives.)

== Aftermath ==
Either in late 539 or early 540, Belisarius besieged Ravenna, with a secure rear. The city was cut off, and supplies dwindled. Byzantine forces under Vitalius, approaching the city from the north via the Balkans, ran by chance into a grain shipment for the city and captured it. Much of the city's grain supply caught fire and was destroyed. Vitigis opened negotiations with the Byzantines to surrender. Justinian offered generous terms to the Goths: division of Italy with lands north of the river Po to the Goths, and the lands south of the river to the Byzantines. The treasury in Ravenna was to be divided equally between the Goths and the Byzantines. Vitigis and his court were surprised by the generous terms, and they accepted. Belisarius was not satisfied, and he refused to sign the treaty. This led the Goth nobles to propose that Belisarius become the Western Roman Emperor and the ruler of Italy, a proposal that later gained the support of Vitigis. Belisarius pretended to accept this proposal, giving all the oaths except for accepting the crown, which he intended to do in front of Vitigis and the Gothic nobles. In May 540, the gates of Ravenna opened, and the Byzantine troops entered the city. Belisarius refused the crown, but before the Goths figured out his true intentions, the Byzantines were in control of Ravenna. In mid-summer 540, Belisarius returned to Constantinople with Ravenna's treasury and Vitigis as prisoner.

By the end of 540, the first phase of the Gothic War was over, with most of Italy under Byzantine control. A plague spread through the empire, killing a third of the population, and the Persian Wars (541–562) weakened Byzantine power. The premature departure of Belisarius and the failure of Justinian in appointing a sole commander-in-chief in Italian forces reignited the Gothic resistance and prolonged the Gothic War by more than a decade. (Note: Historian John Bury argues that Belisarius could have a complete victory over the Goths within "a few months.")

== Sources ==
=== Primary ===
- Procopius (1924) [545–553 AD]. Procopius: History of the Wars, Books VI and VII. Translated by Bronson Dewing, Henry. Cambridge, MA: Harvard University Press. OCLC 491843455.

=== Secondary ===
- Amory, Patrick (2003), People and Identity in Ostrogothic Italy, 489–554, Cambridge University Press, ISBN 978-0-52-152635-7
- Bury, John Bagnell (1958). History of the Later Roman Empire: From the Death of Theodosius I to the Death of Justinian. Vol. 2. Mineola, New York: Dover Publications, Inc. OCLC 1240424678.
- Heather, Peter J. (2018). Rome Resurgent: War and Empire in the Age of Justinian. Oxford: Oxford University Press. ISBN 978-0-19-936274-5.
- Hughes, Ian (2009). Belisarius: The Last Roman General. Yardley, PA: Westholme Publishing. ISBN 978-1-59-416085-1. OCLC 294885267.
- Parnell, David A. (2015). "The social networks of Justinian's generals" (PDF). Journal of Late Antiquity. 8 (1): 114–135. ISSN 1939-6716.
- Syvänne, Ilkka (2021). Military History of Late Rome 518–565. Barnsley, PA: Pen and Sword Military. ISBN 978-1-47-389530-0.
