= Gibal =

6th-century Ostrogoth leader

Gibal (Greek: Γίβαλ, fl. ca. 551) was a commander of the Ostrogoths in the final stages of the Gothic War against the Eastern Roman Empire.

Procopius mentions Gibal along with Indulf (Gundulf) and Scipuar as "the most notable among the Goths" under Totila. Together with Gibal and Indulf he was ordered to capture Ancona in Picenum. Totila also gave them a fleet of 47 ships to aid them in the siege. While Scipuar led the siege of Ancona, Gibal and Indulf assumed command of naval forces. In the fall of 551 they suffered a crushing defeat at the Battle of Sena Gallica, during which Gibal was captured while Indulf escaped.

== Sources ==
- Dewing, Henry Bronson, ed. (1962) [1928]. Procopius, with an English translation by H.B. Dewing, in Seven Volumes. Vol. V: History of the Wars, Books VII [continued] and VIII. The Loeb Classical Library. William Heinemann Ltd. (London) & Harvard University Press (Cambridge, Mass.).
- Martindale, John Robert; Jones, Arnold Hugh Martin; Morris, J., eds. (1992). The Prosopography of the Later Roman Empire, Volume III: A.D. 527–641. Cambridge: Cambridge University Press. ISBN 978-0-521-20160-5.
