= Vacis =

Ostrogothic commander

Vacis (or Wachis) was an Ostrogothic commander under King Witigis during the Byzantine–Gothic War (535–554).

Vacis had a Gothic name (Note: It is related to the modern German wacker, "brave". In the Greek of Procopius, it is spelled both Οὐάκις (Ouakis) and Οὐάκης (Ouakes). Ensslin gives slightly different diacritics: Οὔακις.) and, if the words Procopius attributes to him are accurate, identified as a Goth. From the latter's brief account, it can also be inferred that he could speak Latin.

Procopius (De bello Gothico, I.18.39–41), calls him one of the archontes (leaders) of the Goths and "a man of no mean station". He records that in February 537, after Belisarius took Rome, he was dispatched by Witigis to persuade the citizens of Rome not to abandon the Ostrogoths. He gave a speech at the Porta Salaria in which he reminded the Romans that the Ostrogoths were capable of defending them, but the Greeks (i.e., Byzantines) had only ever came to Italy before as "actors of tragedy and mimes and thieving sailors". The Romans made no response and the siege of Rome began the following day.

Vacis is probably to be identified with the Vacimus (Note: Procopius calls him Οὐάκιμος (Ouakimos). This is the same stem with a -moth suffix.) who fought the Byzantines in the following year. (Note: For Ensslin, "certainly the same" (derselbe ist sicher), but neither Amory nor the PLRE make any attempt to identify them.) Procopius (II.13.5–15) describes him as an archon dispatched by Witigis against the Byzantine forces under Conon at Ancona in the summer of 538, for which task Vacimus took men from the garrison of Osimo. Although he inflicted a major defeat on Conon in the open field, he was unable to take the city. He may have been involved in the failed defence of Osimo in 539, but this can only be a guess.

Vacis may also be identified with the Wacces (Note: In the Latin accusative, Waccenem. Amory renders it Wacca. The identification between him and Vacis was first proposed by Theodor Mommsen. Amory points out the similarity between Vacis' rhetoric as recorded by Procopius and the style of Cassiodorus' letter, but ultimately rejects their identification on the grounds that Wacca appears to have been a civilian and Vacis a military man. The identification is accepted by Theodahad's modern biographer.) who served King Theodahad as maior domus in 534–535. According to a letter of Cassiodorus to the Senate, he was placed in charge of Ostrogothic troops in Rome after Theodahad received a complaint about their behaviour from the Senate. Possibly Wacces is the unnamed individual mentioned in an earlier letter of Cassiodorus who was put in charge of victualing the army in Rome in such a way as to spread the burden of its upkeep fairly across the populace. Wacces was considered a man of virtue and integrity who would stand as an example for the soldiers. If his identification with Vacis is correct, then he must have been part of the faction of the aristocracy that immediately threw its support behind Witigis despite the latter's poor treatment of the deposed Theodahad. (Note: Wigitis had Theodahad murdered after taking power.)

== Bibliography ==
- Amory, Patrick (1997). People and Identity in Ostrogothic Italy, 489–554. Cambridge: Cambridge University Press.
- Bury, J. B. (1958) [1923]. A History of the Later Roman Empire from the Death of Theodosius I to the Death of Justinian. Vol. II. Dover Books.
- Cameron, Averil (2000) [1985]. Procopius and the Sixth Century. Taylor & Francis.
- Ekonomou, Andrew J. (2007). Byzantine Rome and the Greek Popes: Eastern Influences on Rome and the Papacy from Gregory the Great to Zacharias, A.D. 590–752. Plymouth: Lexington Books.
- Ensslin, Wilhelm [in German] (1948). "Wachis". Realencyclopädie der classischen Altertumswissenschaft. Vol. 2nd ser., vol. VIIA, part 14. Stuttgart: Alfred Druckenmüller. col. 2041.
- Martindale, John R., ed. (1980). The Prosopography of the Later Roman Empire: Volume II, AD 395–527. Cambridge: Cambridge University Press. ISBN 0-521-20159-4.
- Procopius (1919). History of the Wars. Vol. 3, Books V and VI. Translated by H. B. Dewing. New York: G. P. Putnam's Sons.
- Schönfeld, Moritz [in German] (1911). Wörterbuch der altgermanischen personen- und völkernamen: Nach der überlieferung des klassischen altertums. Heidelberg: Carl Winter's Universitätsbuchhandlung.
- Vitiello, Massimiliano (2014). Theodahad: A Platonic King at the Collapse of Ostrogothic Italy. Toronto: University of Toronto Press.
