= Indulf (6th century) =

6th-century Gothic military leader

- Military career
- Allegiance: Byzantine Empire (until 549); Ostrogothic Kingdom (from 549)
- Wars: Gothic War

Indulf (Greek: Ἰνδούλφ), also known as Gundulf (Greek: Γουνδούλφ), was a Byzantine mercenary who defected to the Ostrogoths and became a leader in their army in the last years of the Gothic War of 535–554.

Indulf is first mentioned by the historian Procopius as a barbarian (in all probability a Goth) bodyguard of the Byzantine general Belisarius. When Belisarius departed Italy in early 549, Indulf remained behind, and soon after joined the Goths. In late spring/early summer of 549, the Ostrogoth king Totila (r. 541–552) entrusted him with a large army and a fleet and sent him to campaign in Dalmatia, which the Byzantines had conquered in 535/536. There, Indulf used his known association with Belisarius to capture the fortified towns of Movicurum and Laureate, whose inhabitants had not learned of his volte-face. Indulf killed the inhabitants and plundered the two settlements and the surrounding countryside. He also defeated a Byzantine force sent against him by the local Byzantine governor and captured a number of supply ships destined for the Byzantine army in Italy, before returning with his men to Italy.

Indulf reappears in 551, when he was one of three Gothic generals entrusted with besieging and capturing Ancona. When a Byzantine relief force sailed against them, Indulf and his fellow general Gibal headed the fleet that confronted them. The resulting Battle of Sena Gallica was a disaster for the inexperienced Goths; Gibal was killed and most of the ships were sunk or captured, though Indulf was able to escape with 11 vessels. Upon reaching land, the Goths burned their ships and quickly abandoned the siege of Ancona, taking refuge in Auximum. Indulf makes a last appearance in Procopius's narrative after the Gothic defeat at the Battle of Mons Lactarius, where he was one of the leaders of the remnants of the Gothic army that refused to surrender and instead marched north to Ticinum.

== Sources ==
- Bury, John Bagnell (1958) [1923]. History of the Later Roman Empire: From the Death of Theodosius I to the Death of Justinian, Volume 2. Mineola, New York: Dover Publications. OCLC 41478187.
- Martindale, John R., ed. (1992). The Prosopography of the Later Roman Empire: Volume III, AD 527–641. Cambridge: Cambridge University Press. ISBN 0-521-20160-8.
