= Asbadus =

Gepid leader in the Gothic war

Asbadus (Greek: Ἄσβαδος; c. 520 – died 556) was a Gepid leader fighting for the Eastern Roman Empire against the Ostrogoths in the final stages of the Gothic War.

According to Procopius, Asbadus, a "young [...] and especially active man" accompanied Narses to Italy in 552, at the head of 400 of his fellow Gepids. Asbadus fought in the decisive Battle of Taginae, during which he pursued and inflicted a mortal wound upon the Ostrogothic king Totila, without knowing who he was. During the mêlée he was wounded in the foot by Totila's general Scipuar and was left behind when his comrades retreated. Procopius recounts that when Asbadus rushed at Totila, one of the king's men shouted: "What is this, you dog? Are you rushing to smite your own master?", which Patrick Amory interprets either as an indication that Asbadus was a defector from Gothic service, or that as a Gepid, he was considered to be a "natural" subject of the Goths.

Asbadus died in 556 AD and was buried in Pavia. In his epitaph, preserved by a later Lombard chronicle, he is celebrated as one of the "restorers of the Roman Empire in Italy".

== Sources ==
- Amory, Patrick (2003). People and Identity in Ostrogothic Italy, 489-554. Cambridge University Press. ISBN 0521526353.
- Dewing, Henry Bronson, ed. (1962) [1928]. Procopius, with an English translation by H.B. Dewing, in Seven Volumes. Vol. V: History of the Wars, Books VII [continued] and VIII. The Loeb Classical Library. William Heinemann Ltd. (London) & Harvard University Press (Cambridge, Mass.).
- Martindale, John R., ed. (1992). The Prosopography of the Later Roman Empire: Volume III, AD 527–641. Cambridge: Cambridge University Press. ISBN 0-521-20160-8.
