= Justin (magister militum per Illyricum) =

Byzantine army officer

- Military career
- Allegiance: Byzantine Empire
- Rank: magister militum per Illyricum
- Wars: Gothic War (535–554); Siege of Ariminum (538); Siege of Milan (538–539); Battle of Mucellium

Justin (Latin: Justinus; Greek: Ἰουστῖνος) was a 6th-century Byzantine general under Emperor Justinian I (r. 527–565). He participated in the Gothic War (535–554).

== Biography ==
Nothing is known of Justin's origins or early life. He appears for the first time in 538, when along with Chamberlain Narses he was sent to Italy with 7,000 men as reinforcements for Belisarius, who had just successfully defended Rome against the Ostrogoths. At the time, he held the position of magister militum per Illyricum, a post he may have been appointed to already in 536, after the death of general Mundus. In the dissension that broke out in the Byzantine army between Belisarius and Narses, Justin sided with the latter, and accompanied him to the relief of the Gothic Siege of Ariminum, defended by the general John the Sanguinary. After the successful outcome of the operation, along with John, Justin proceeded to occupy the region of Aemilia against little Gothic resistance during the winter of 538/539. The rift in the imperial army had by this time deepened to the point that Justin and John outright refused to obey orders from Belisarius to march to the aid of the city of Mediolanum, which was being besieged by the Goths with their Frankish allies, instead waiting for relevant orders from Narses. The delay proved fatal, and the city was captured and razed by the Franko-Gothic army.

In the aftermath of this disaster, Narses was recalled, and Belisarius confirmed as supreme commander with absolute authority for Italy. Belisarius, for his part, resolved to conclude the war by taking the Ostrogothic capital, Ravenna. Prior to this, he had to deal with the two Gothic strongholds of Auximum and Faesulae. While a part of the Byzantine army under Martin and John hindered the Gothic army under Uraias to cross the River Po, some Isaurians and regular infantrymen under Justin and Cyprian besieged Faesulae, and Belisarius himself undertook the siege of Auximum. As Faesulae was well fortified and impossible to storm, the siege dragged from April into mid-autumn of 539. The Byzantine troops repelled several sorties by the besieged Goths, eventually forcing them to capitulate through lack of food.

Justin is not heard of again until 542, but he probably remained in Italy during this time. In that year, he was the commander of Florence, when he learned that the Gothic king Totila had assembled a large army and was heading towards the city. Lacking supplies to withstand a Gothic siege, Justin urgently sent for aid to the Byzantine commanders in Ravenna. John, Bessas and Cyprian led a relief force towards Florence, forcing the Goths to raise their siege. After leaving a small detachment to guard Florence, Justin with his own men joined the other three generals and marched north in pursuit of the Goths. The two armies met at Mucellium, and the subsequent battle was a rout for the Byzantines. The Byzantine generals dispersed to fortified places across central Italy and henceforth failed to cooperate; Justin himself returned to the safety of Florence.

In late 545, he was placed by Belisarius, prior to the latter's departure for the Balkans, as commander of Ravenna. He is mentioned again as being left in command of the city garrison by Narses in 552, so he may have remained its governor, untroubled by the Goths, throughout this time. Nothing further is known of him.

== Sources ==
- Bury, John Bagnell (1958) [1923]. History of the Later Roman Empire: From the Death of Theodosius I to the Death of Justinian, Volume 2. Mineola, New York: Dover Publications. OCLC 41478187.
- Martindale, John R., ed. (1992). The Prosopography of the Later Roman Empire: Volume III, AD 527–641. Cambridge: Cambridge University Press. ISBN 0-521-20160-8.
