= Battle of Sena Gallica (551) =

Naval battle between the Byzantine Empire and the Ostrogothic Kingdom of Italy

- Part of the Gothic War (535–554)
- Main army movements during the second phase of the Gothic War
Date	Autumn 551
Location	off Sena Gallica (modern Senigallia), Italy
Result	Byzantine victory

Belligerents
Byzantine Empire	Ostrogothic Kingdom

Commanders and leaders
John; Valerian	Indulf; Gibal (POW)

Strength
50 warships	47 warships

Casualties and losses
Unknown	36 ships lost, the remainder burned afterward

The Battle of Sena Gallica was a naval engagement fought in the autumn of 551 off the Italian Adriatic coast near Sena Gallica, (modern Senigallia). It marked a turning point in the Gothic War (535–554) between the Byzantines and the Ostrogoths (Goths).

In 550, the Byzantine Empire was struggling to maintain control of Italy after earlier victories under Belisarius. Following his recall by Emperor Justinian I, disagreements among the remaining Byzantine commanders allowed the Goths to recover under their charismatic king, Totila. By 550, Totila had regained much of Italy, invaded Sicily, and built a fleet capable of challenging Byzantine control of the seas. He also sought to capture the remaining Byzantine strongholds on the Italian Peninsula and in particular the coastal city of Ancon. In autumn 551, the Goths besieged Ancon by land and sea while at the same time Totila sent part of his navy to raid nearby regions on the west side of the Balkan Peninsula. In response, the Byzantine generals Valerian and John the Sanguinary assembled a fleet and sailed toward Sena Gallica to provide relief to Ancon. As the fleets were similar in size, the Goths were emboldened to engage the Byzantines at sea. During the battle, the more experienced Byzantine sailors maintained good formation and coordination, while the Gothic fleet fell into disorder and suffered losses as a result. The Byzantine victory forced the Goths to abandon the siege of Ancon and marked the end of the Goths' bid to deny the seas to the Byzantines.

== Background ==
In 550, the Gothic War was in its fifteenth year. The first five years of the war had seen a series of Byzantine successes under general Belisarius, which had led to the capture of the Gothic capital, Ravenna, and the apparent restoration of Byzantine rule over most of the Italian Peninsula by 540. Subsequently, Emperor Justinian I recalled Belisarius. The commanders left behind soon began squabbling among themselves, while the Goths rallied their forces. Under the leadership of their new king, Totila, they soon reversed the situation, overrunning the Byzantine forces. The return of Belisarius in 544 did not reverse the Gothic tide, and by 550, the Byzantines were left with a handful of coastal strongholds in the mainland, (Note: These included Ravenna, Ancon, and Crotone.) and in the spring of that year, Totila even invaded Sicily, the Byzantines' strategic base. Wishing to deny the Byzantines access to the Italian Peninsula and the ability to land fresh troops or reinforce and resupply their outposts, Totila had created a navy of 400 warships to contest the seas. At the same time, Justinian prepared one last major effort to reclaim Italy, under his chamberlain (cubicularius), Narses.

Totila, aware of the looming threat, was determined to deny the Byzantines their last important bases on Italian soil, most prominently Ancon (modern-day Ancona). After withdrawing from Sicily with the spoils of their pillaging, Totila sent his troops to besiege Ancon in autumn 551. Forty-seven ships blockaded it from the sea, and the rest of the Gothic fleet, 300 ships, was sent to raid the coast of Epirus and the Ionian Islands. Ancon, being blockaded by land and sea, was likely to fall. The Byzantine general Valerian, commander of Ravenna, called upon his nephew John the Sanguinary, a general who was stationed at Salona in Dalmatia, to send a relief force. John was awaiting the arrival of Narses and his army from Thrace. Despite John having explicit orders from Emperor Justinian not to leave Salona, he immediately manned 38 ships with his veterans, and was soon joined by 12 more ships from Ravenna under Valerian himself. The joint fleet set sail for Sena Gallica, some 25 kilometres (16 mi) north of Ancon.

== Battle ==
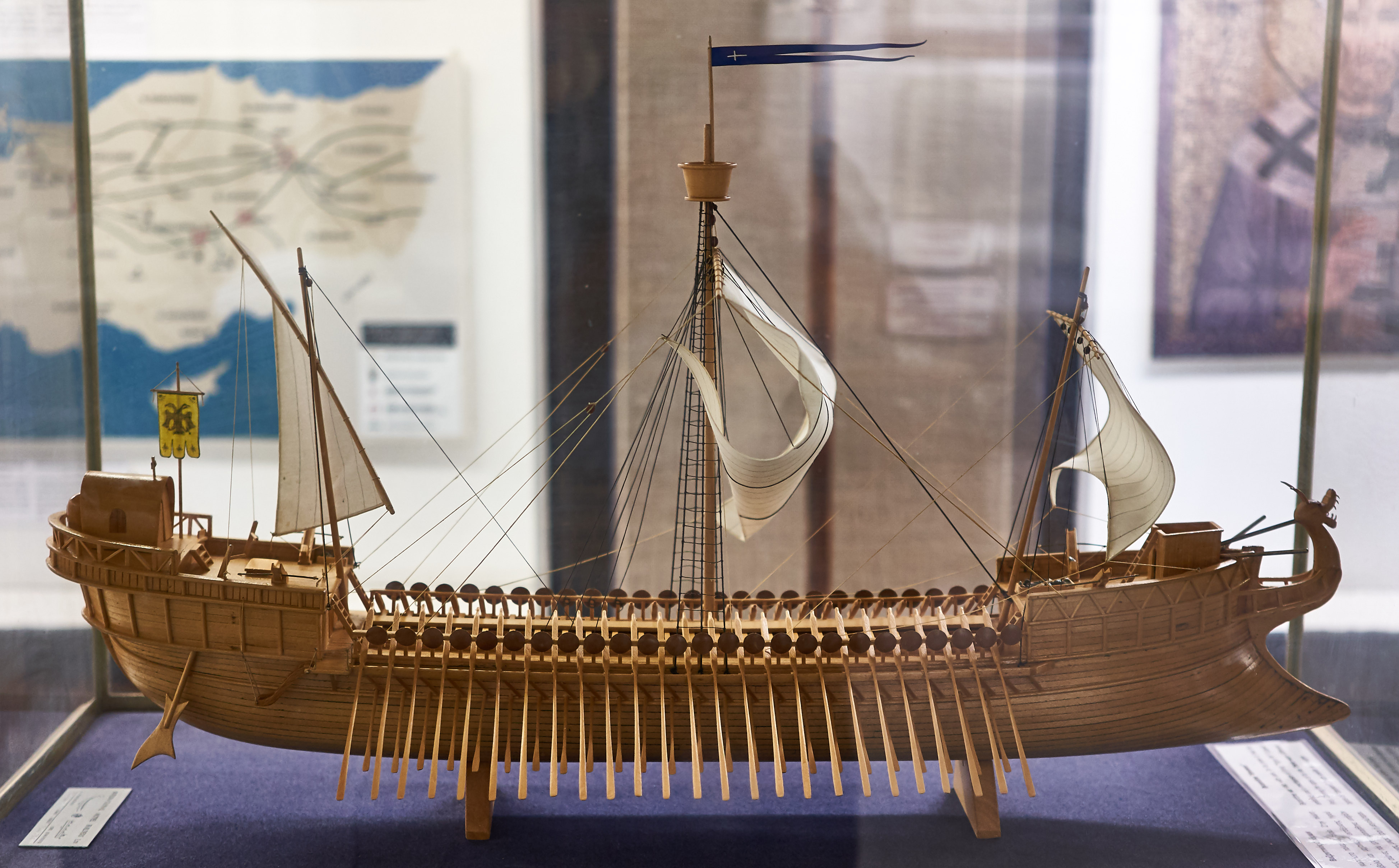
Model of a Byzantine warship (dromon) with oars, located at the Athens War Museum

As the two fleets were almost equal in size, the two Gothic commanders, Indulf and Gibal (the former a renegade retainer of Belisarius), resolved to meet the Byzantines in battle immediately and sailed to meet them. Naval combat during this period was dominated by missile exchanges and boarding actions, while warships with rams, typical of Classical antiquity, were less frequent and disappeared from the seventh century onward. In this form of combat, experience in the ability to maintain a formation of ships was essential.

According to contemporary historian Procopius, the battle unfolded in two phases. In the first phase, the opposing fleets advanced head-on, exchanging missiles before some ships closed for boarding and hand-to-hand combat. Archers and spearmen supported these attacks while boarding parties used grappling hooks and boarding bridges to seize enemy vessels. In the second phase, the Byzantine crews (mostly Greek sailors) held the advantage over the inexperienced Goths. The Gothic fleet fell into disorder as some ships came closer together and became unable to maneuver because their oars became entangled, while others became isolated. The Byzantines maintained good formation and coordinated their movements effectively, allowing them to support one another and exploit openings in the Gothic line by outflanking, ramming, and sinking isolated Gothic vessels. In the end, the weary Gothic fleet disintegrated, and its ships retreated. The Goths lost 36 ships, and Gibal was captured, while Indulf with the remainder fled towards Ancon. As soon as he came close to the Gothic army's camp, he beached his ships and set them on fire.

== Aftermath ==
The defeat disheartened the Goths, who abandoned the siege of Ancon and withdrew. Shortly after the Byzantine victory, Artabanes, the new Byzantine commander in Sicily, captured the four fortresses that had previously fallen to the Goths. These successes signaled to the Goths that their position was weakening and they started to believe that they might be unable to withstand a major Byzantine offensive. Totila sent ambassadors to Constantinople to negotiate peace, offering to relinquish Gothic claims to Sicily and Dalmatia and to pay the taxes owed on abandoned estates in those provinces. However, Justinian refused to consider the proposal. Narses from Salona invaded Italy and in July 552 defeated the Gothic army in the Battle of Taginae, where Totila was mortally wounded. Later in the same year, the Gothic resistance was shattered after the Battle of Mons Lactarius, marking the beginning of the restoration of Byzantine control of the Italian Peninsula. The battle was also the last major naval engagement fought in the Mediterranean Sea for more than a century, until the Battle of the Masts in 655.
