= Al-Mundhir =

Al-Mundhir (Arabic: المنذر), meaning 'the warner', hellenized as Alamoundaros and Latinized as Alamundarus and Alamoundaras, may refer to:

- al-Mundhir I ibn al-Nu'man, King of the Lakhmids (r. 418–462)
- al-Mundhir II ibn al-Nu'man, King of the Ghassanids (r. 453–472)
- al-Mundhir II ibn al-Mundhir, King of the Lakhmids (r. 490–497)
- al-Mundhir III ibn al-Nu'man, King of the Lakhmids (r. 503/5–554)
- al-Mundhir III ibn al-Harith, King of the Ghassanids (r. 569–581)
- al-Mundhir IV ibn al-Mundhir, King of the Lakhmids (r. 574–580)
- al-Mundhir VI ibn al-Nu'man, King of the Lakhmids (r. 633 CE)
- al-Mundhir of Córdoba (c. 842 – 888), Umayyad Emir of Córdoba (r. 886–888)
- Al-Mundhir ibn Sawa (fl. early 7th century), ruler of Bahrain during the time of Muhammad
