= Battle of Mucellium =

Battle in the Gothic War (542)

- Part of the Gothic War (535-554)
- Main army movements during the second phase of the Gothic War
Date	542 AD
Location	Mugello, Italy 43°57′N 11°23′E
Result	Ostrogothic victory

Belligerents
Byzantine Empire	Ostrogothic Kingdom

Commanders and leaders
John; Bessas (WIA); Cyprian; Justin	Totila
- Location within Italy Battle of Mucellium (Mediterranean)

The Battle of Mucellium was an engagement in 542 AD in the Mugello valley, Italy, between Ostrogoths (Goths) and Byzantines during the Gothic War.

Within the first five years of the war, the Byzantines had conquered much of Italy, culminating in the capture of the capital of the Gothic kingdom in 540. However, corruption and harsh taxation reignited Gothic resistance under Totila. The Byzantine commanders' belated attempt to counter that resurgence led to early failures.

Byzantine forces advanced against the Goths, who had recently lifted the siege of Florence and camped in the Mucellium (now called Mugello). Although the Byzantines outnumbered the Goths, Totila's forces routed the Byzantine detachment on a hillside, triggering panic that spread to the rest of the army and led to a complete collapse. The Goths captured prisoners, while the surviving Byzantine commanders fled to isolated strongholds. The lack of coordination by the remaining Byzantine forces allowed Totila to launch a successful military campaign in southern Italy and eventually advance against Rome in 544.

== Background ==
Following the fall of Ravenna in May 540 AD, the capital of the Gothic kingdom, Belisarius had succeeded in restoring former Western Roman territories (Sicily and most of the Italian Peninsula) to Byzantine rule. However, his stratagem of inducing the Goths to surrender by offering him the Western Roman imperial crown had spooked Byzantine Emperor Justinian. Although Belisarius returned to Constantinople in mid-summer 540 with Ravenna's treasury and the defeated Gothic King Vitiges as prisoner, Justinian refused him a triumph. The general's departure was also needed on the eastern front against the Persians in the upcoming Lazic War (541–562).

Justinian replaced Belisarius with three commanders of equal authority—Bessas, John the Sanguinary, and Constantinianus. The three commanders fell into rivalry and turned to plundering the Italian population instead of fighting the remaining Goths. The situation deteriorated further when Justinian imposed a severe tax audit, compelling Italians to pay alleged arrears dating from Gothic rule, while simultaneously reducing soldiers' rewards for wounds and acts of bravery. This climate of lawlessness undermined discipline, alienated the troops, and rapidly destroyed Italian loyalty to the empire.

Belisarius's withdrawal from Italy also encouraged the newly crowned Gothic king, Ildibad, whose cause was strengthened by Byzantine abuses. A Byzantine army was defeated at Treviso by Ildibad, enabling the Goths to regain control of much of the Po Valley. His success was short-lived, as he was assassinated before he could consolidate power. Unable to agree on a suitable candidate from among themselves, the Goths accepted Eraric, who belonged to a tribe distinct from the Goths, as their ruler. Eraric convened a council and secured Gothic approval to send an embassy to Constantinople to negotiate peace on the same terms previously offered to Vitigis before the fall of Ravenna. Privately, he dispatched his own agents and instructed them to inform Justinian that, in exchange for the rank of patrician and a substantial payment, he would abdicate and surrender northern Italy to the empire. In late 541, Eraric was assassinated by the Gothic nobility for his willingness to surrender to the Byzantines, and Ildibad's nephew, Totila, succeeded him as king.

== Prelude ==
Following the murder of Gothic King Eraric, Justinian realized that the Goths were paralyzed by internal dissensions, and his Byzantine commanders stationed in Italy had not done anything to take advantage of the situation. He sent a letter reprimanding them for their inactivity and demanded action. The Byzantine commanders John, Bessas, and Cyprian gathered in Ravenna to debate their course of action. The Byzantine commanders decided to send Constantian and Alexander with 12,000 men to take Verona. The failed Siege of Verona signaled to the newly crowned king of the Goths, Totila, to take the initiative while the Byzantines remained under poor leadership. This led to the Battle of Faventia in spring 542, where Totila, commanding an army of about 5,000 men, pursued and defeated the Byzantine army.

Following his success against the Byzantines, Totila sent part of his troops to attack Florence. Justin, the Byzantine commander of Florence, had neglected to adequately provision the city against a siege since he was not expecting an attack, and hurriedly sent for aid to the other Byzantine commanders in the area: John, Bessas, and Cyprian. They gathered their forces and came to the relief of Florence.

== Battle ==
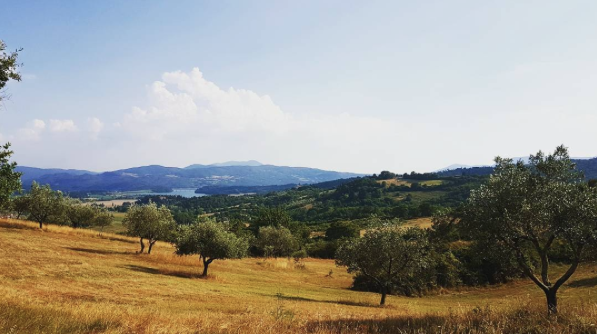
Photo of the modern day countryside near Galliano di Mugello capturing the topography of the region

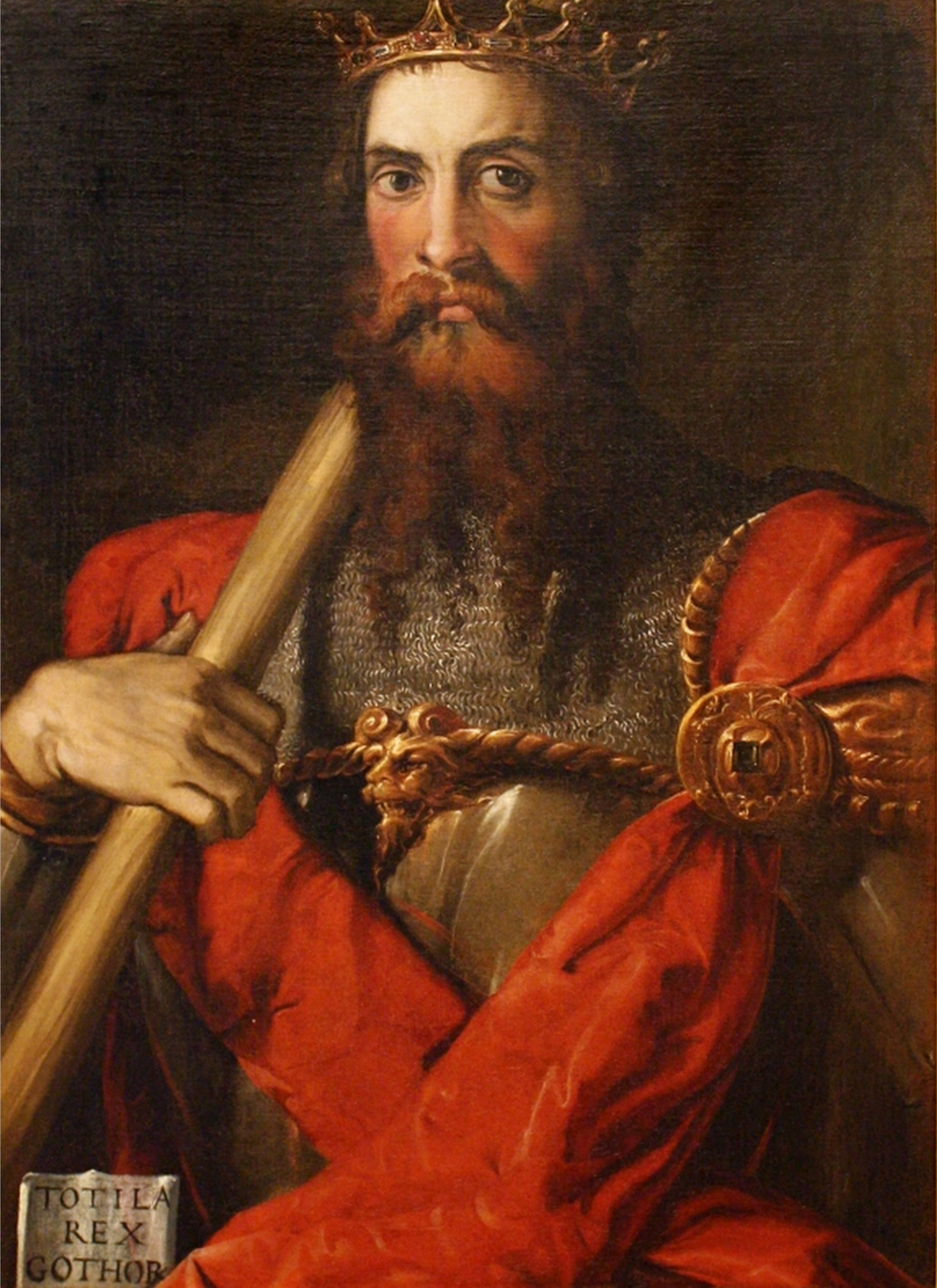
Totila by Francesco Salviati, c. 1549

At the approach of the Byzantine army, the Goths raised the siege and retreated north, to the region of Mucellium. The Byzantine leadership decided to choose an elite force of the best men under each commander to pursue the Goths, while the rest of the army followed at a normal pace. The strategy called for a smaller force to launch a surprise attack to occupy the Goths, after which the main army would advance and decisively conclude the battle. They cast lots to choose who would lead the surprise attack and the lot fell on John. However, the other commanders were not willing to carry out the agreement by providing their best men for this attack, leaving John to rely on his own troops. The Goths moved from the plain to a nearby hill (Note: The exact location is unknown) upon the news that the Byzantines pursued them.

John and his detachment of troops approached the Goths located on the hill, but the Goths vigorously defended their position against John's men by rushing down the hill with great shouts. John's men initially held as John encouraged the men with great shout and eager gestures. A javelin killed one of John's bodyguards and soon a rumor spread among the soldiers that John had fallen. John's men broke and fled towards the oncoming main Byzantine force, which was deployed on the plain as a phalanx. The view of deserting troops spread the panic to the main army as well, resulting in the entire Byzantine army retreating in disorder. Bessas was wounded by the pursuing Goths.

== Aftermath ==
The Goths took captives, who were treated well and even induced to join the Gothic army. (Note: According to Procopius, Totila "showed great kindness to his prisoners, and thereby succeeded in winning their allegiance, and henceforth most of them voluntarily served under him against the Romans.") Totila went on to seize Caesena and Petra Pertusa in the region of Umbria, but Tuscany remained under Byzantine control. Subsequently, Totila did not attempt to conquer central Italy, where the Byzantines controlled large, well-fortified cities. Instead, Totila advanced rapidly through southern Italy with great success, including the capture of the fortress of Cumae.

The Byzantine generals and the remaining troops fled to isolated strongholds (Bessas to Spoleto, Justin back to Florence, Cyprian to Perugia, and John to Rome), where they made preparations against a potential siege as they did not want to meet the Goths in the open. From that point onward, they failed to coordinate their efforts against the Goths, leading to the prolongation of the war. (Note: Historian Ian Hughes argued that a contributing factor to the fractured Byzantine leadership was the 542 plague on Italian Peninsula, as the commanders remained in place to avoid catching the plague.) In response to the setbacks in Italy, Justinian sent the civilian Maximin to be Praetorian Prefect of Italy, but Maximin's indecision left him unable to formulate an effective strategy against the Goths. As a result, Totila captured Naples and razed its walls to the ground. Then he advanced to besiege Rome in spring 544. Upon receiving this news, Justinian recalled general Belisarius from the eastern front, where he commanded a Byzantine force against Persia, and dispatched him to Italy.

== Sources ==
=== Primary ===
- Procopius (1924). Procopius, The History of Wars (in Ancient Greek). Translated by Dewing, Henry B. London S. Heinemann.

=== Secondary ===
- Amory, Patrick (2003-10-16). People and Identity in Ostrogothic Italy, 489-554. Cambridge University Press. ISBN 978-0-521-52635-7.
- Bury, John Bagnell (1958). History of the Later Roman Empire: From the Death of Theodosius I to the Death of Justinian. Vol. 2. Mineola, New York: Dover Publications, Inc.
- Heather, Peter J. (2018). Rome Resurgent: War and Empire in the Age of Justinian. Oxford: Oxford University Press. ISBN 9780199362745.
- Hodgkin, Thomas (1896). Italy and Her Invaders: The imperial restoration, 535–553. Oxford: Clarendon Press.
- Hughes, Ian (2009). Belisarius: The Last Roman General. Yardley, PA: Westholme. ISBN 9781594160851. OCLC 294885267.
- Martindale, John R. (1992). The Prosopography of the Later Roman Empire 2 Part Set: Volume 3, AD 527-641. Cambridge University Press. ISBN 978-0-521-20160-5.
- Syvänne, Ilkka (2021). Military History of Late Rome 518–565. Yorkshire, PA: Pen and Sword Military. ISBN 978-1-4738-9530-0.
