= Cyprian (Byzantine commander) =

Cyprian (Greek: Κυπριανὸς) was a Byzantine military leader who played a role in the wars of the reign of Justinian I. He was one of Belisarius’ subordinates during the Vandalic War. During the Battle of Tricamarum he served in the left wing. During surrender negotiations with Gelimer he informed Gelimer of the guarantee for his safety. During the Siege of Rome when the Goths broke through the first wall in a section of the defences where there were two walls. Belisarius sent him on a counterattack. The Goths panicked and fled, their siege engines were burned. Later he and Justinus were sent to besiege Fisula. Due to the landscape they couldn’t prevent sallies or fully cut the city off. Eventually they took Fisula after which they moved to assist Belisarius in the Siege of Auximus, where the leaders of the Fisula garrison were paraded in front of the city. This caused the Auximus garrison to open negotiations and eventually switch sides. He was killed in 545 by his own bodyguards.
