= Totila =

King of the Ostrogoths from 541 to 552

Totila T𐍉𐍄𐌹𐌻𐌰
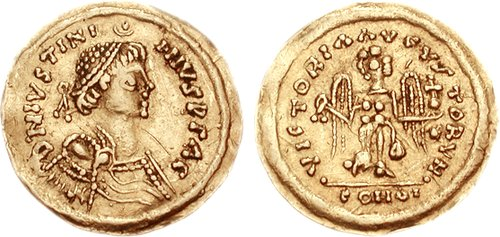
- A gold tremissis in the name of Justinian I, minted by Totila

King of the Ostrogoths
- Reign: c. October 541 – 1 July 552
- Coronation: 541
- Predecessor: Eraric
- Successor: Teia
- Died: 1 July 552; Taginae, Ostrogothic Kingdom
- Religion: Arianism

Totila, original name Baduila (died 1 July 552), was the penultimate King of the Ostrogoths, reigning from 541 to 552. A skilled military and political leader, Totila reversed the tide of the Gothic War, recovering by 543 almost all the territories in Italy that the Eastern Roman Empire had captured from the Ostrogothic Kingdom in 540.

A grandnephew of Theudis, sword-bearer of Theodoric the Great and king of the Visigoths, Totila was elected king by Ostrogothic nobles in the autumn of 541 after the deaths of two former Ostrogothic kings, Ildibad and Eraric. Both had been killed by the Gothic nobility for attempting to surrender to the Romans. Totila proved himself both as a military and political leader, winning the support of the lower classes by liberating slaves and distributing land to the peasants. After a successful defence at Verona, Totila pursued and defeated a numerically superior army at the Battle of Faventia in 542. Totila followed these victories by defeating the Romans outside Florence and capturing Naples. By 543, fighting on land and sea, he had reconquered the bulk of Rome's southern territories, but not the capital. Rome still held out, and Totila appealed unsuccessfully to the Senate in a letter reminding them of Rome's loyalty to his predecessor Theodoric the Great. In the spring of 544, the Eastern Roman emperor Justinian I sent general Belisarius to recapture Italian territory, but Totila captured Rome in 546 from Belisarius, which was depopulated after a yearlong siege. When Totila left to fight the Byzantines in Lucania, south of Naples, Belisarius retook Rome and rebuilt its fortifications.

After Belisarius retreated to Constantinople in 549, Totila recaptured Rome again and went on to complete the reconquest of Italy and Sicily. By the end of 550, Totila had recaptured nearly all of his previous territorial possession; however, Ravenna and four coastal towns remained under Byzantine control. The following year Justinian sent his general Narses with a force of 35,000 Lombards, Gepids, and Heruli to Italy in a march around the Adriatic Sea; these combined forces approached Ravenna from the north. During the Battle of Taginae, a decisive engagement in the Apennines near present-day Fabriano, the Gothic army was defeated and Totila was mortally wounded. Totila was succeeded by his relative Teia, who later died at the Battle of Mons Lactarius. Pockets of resistance, reinforced by Franks and Alemanni who had invaded Italy in 553, continued until 562, at which point the Byzantines gained control of the country following Justinian's conquests.

== Early life ==
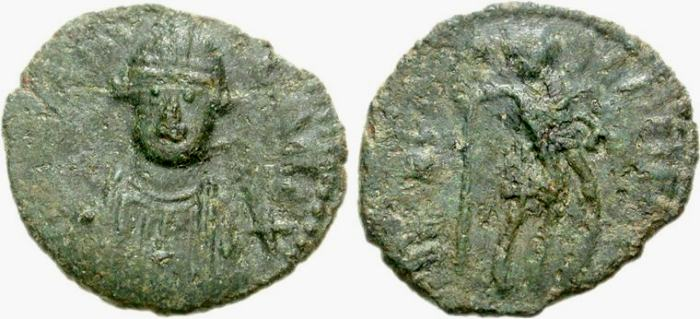
decanummium coin of Baduila (Badvela Rex), issued AD 541–552

"Totila" was the nom de guerre of a man whose real name was Baduila, as can be seen from the coinage he issued. "Totila" is the name used by the Byzantine historian Procopius, who accompanied the Byzantine general Belisarius during the Gothic War, and whose chronicles are the main source of information for Totila. According to Henry Bradley, 'Totila' and 'Baduila' are diminutives of Totabadws. Historian Marco Cristini has proposed that the consistent use of the name "Totila" by Procopius and other Eastern Roman authors, rather than the Gothic king's actual name "Baduila" (as attested on contemporary coinage), may have served a propagandistic purpose. Cristini argues that this naming choice was likely encouraged by Emperor Justinian as a means of delegitimising the Gothic leader. The name "Totila," potentially perceived as diminutive or less dignified, could have been employed to reinforce the narrative of Baduila as a mere usurper or rebel, rather than a legitimate monarch. Given the numismatic evidence, Cristini contends that the true name was certainly known to Byzantine authors, suggesting that its omission was a deliberate rhetorical strategy. Born in Treviso, Totila was a grandnephew of Theudis, king of the Visigoths, and a sword-bearer; a role that made for a good career among his kin.

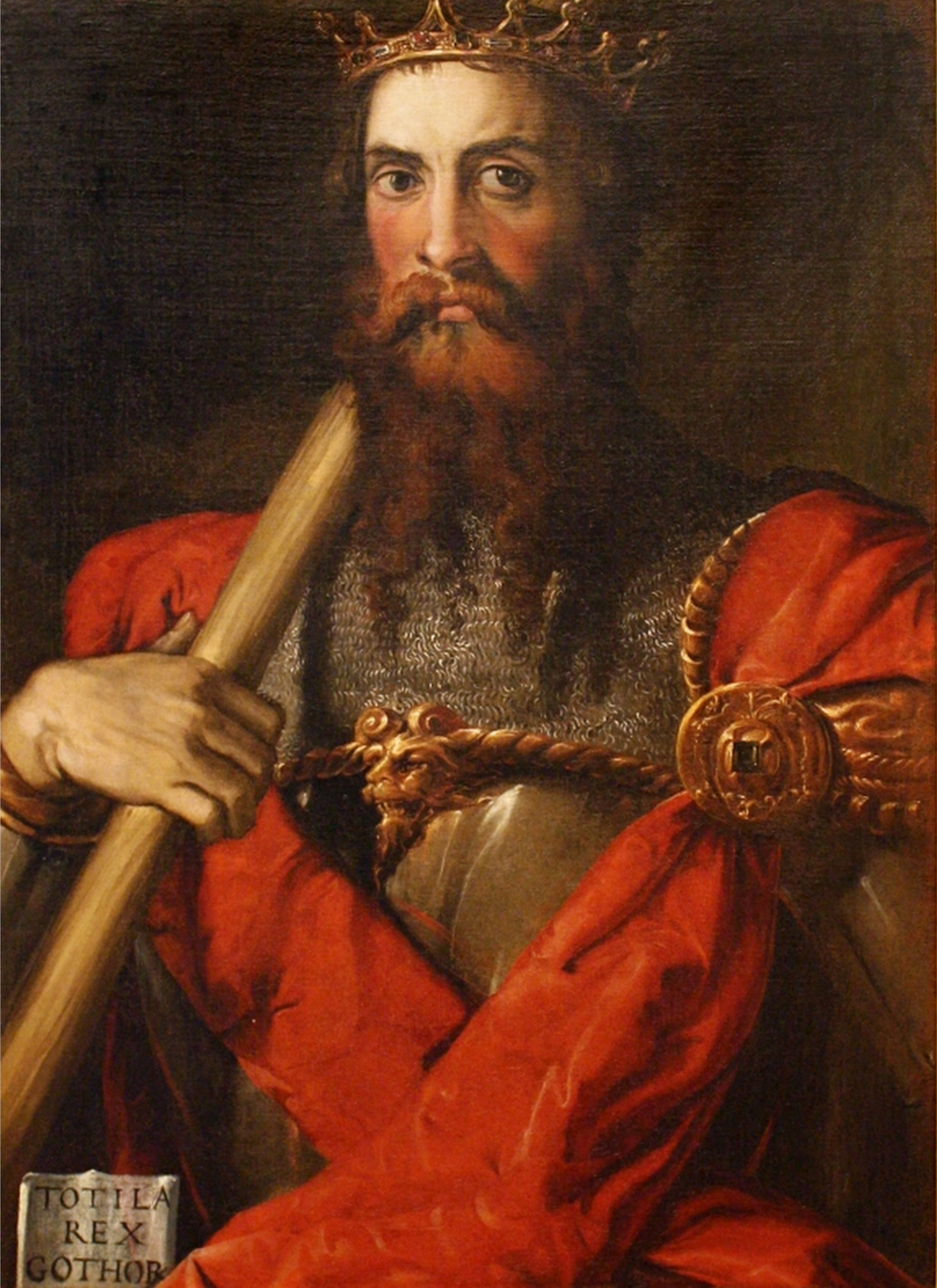
Totila by Francesco Salviati, c. 1549

Totila was elected king of the Ostrogoths in 541 after the assassination of his uncle Ildibad and having surreptitiously engineered the assassination of Ildibad's short-lived successor Eraric, in 541. (Note: Eraric retained the Gothic kingship for a period no more than five months.) Like Alaric I, Totila was quite young when he became king and was declared such by the Goths to recover dominion over the Italians. The official Byzantine position, adopted by Procopius and even by the Romanized Goth, Jordanes—writing just before the conclusion of the Gothic Wars—was that Totila was a usurper. According to historian Peter Heather, as Ildebadus's nephew, Totila nonetheless hailed from a prominent Gothic family, one that surrounded and "even occasionally challenged Theodoric's Amal dynasty". (Note: Jordanes' Getica (551) overlooks the then-recent successes of Totila. Historian Peter Heather explains that Totila's success was partly attributable to two factors; those are Justinian's inability to reinforce his Italian army due to the ongoing war with Persia, and Totila's lenient treatment of prisoners—especially other barbarian troops—who, once the Roman military service pay owed to them failed to arrive, were co-opted into Totila's army as reinforcements instead.)

== Initial victories ==
Eraric's murder and replacement with Totila suggested to the Byzantines—since Eraric favoured negotiation with Imperial power—that this Gothic successor likely preferred war and so a Byzantine expeditionary force of twelve thousand men was sent north from Ravenna to Verona to stave off any possible impending attack.

At Verona, a local sympathizer allowed a contingent of Roman soldiers into the city and while the Goths panicked at first, they soon realized that the main army was stopped some distance from the city. They promptly shut the gates and the Roman soldiers who had made it into the city escaped by leaping from the walls. Meanwhile, the Roman forces retreated back to Faenza (Battle of Faventia), where Totila met them with 5,000 men to give battle, while another 300 Gothic archers surprised them from the rear, resulting in a rout, whereby the Goths acquired both prisoners and battle standards. (Note: Not only were the Romans contending with Totila, they were also in a conflagration with Persia, while at the same time a plague was ravaging the Imperial provinces in 542. In Constantinople, upwards of 300,000 people may have succumbed to sickness, and Justinian himself fell ill but survived.) Correspondingly, historian Thomas Burns concludes that Totila was a gifted warrior and governor, and as an Ostrogoth ranks only second to Theodoric the Great himself.

After securing victory in 542 at Faenza, Totila's Goths besieged the stoutly-defended Florence in an effort to open the Via Cassia to Rome but when Imperial forces arrived to relieve the city, Totila withdrew to the Mugello valley, where historian Herwig Wolfram states, they "inflicted a crushing defeat on the enemy", at the Battle of Mucellium. Since this region was relatively spared of any previous conflicts, Totila's Goths were able to secure significant provisions and booty. In the meantime, instead of pursuing the conquest of central Italy, where the Imperial forces were too formidable for his small army, he decided to transfer his operations to the south of the peninsula. He captured Beneventum as well as Cumae, which remained a Gothic stronghold even after Gothic kingship no longer existed.

During a period of crisis amid the Eastern Roman military leadership, which placed strains on its civilian population across its domains, the historian Victor Davis Hanson asserts that Totila posed as a "national liberator who would throw off the renewed chains of Roman oppression." Hanson further contends that this squabbling among Byzantine generals from "different factions and ethnicities" caused the forfeiture of what Belisarius had previously won in 540. In the aftermath of the Battle of Faenza, Totila not only achieved a tactical victory over the Roman forces but also succeeded in attracting Roman deserters to his own ranks. Historian Marco Cristini argues that undermining the cohesion of the Roman army was a deliberate and strategic component of Totila’s military approach. Equally important, according to Cristini, was the reinforcement of his own forces through the integration of disaffected Roman soldiers. These individuals, often disgruntled due to unpaid wages, disputes with commanding officers, or personal ambitions, were exploited by Totila to gain intelligence and logistical advantages. Cristini further notes, citing Procopius (Wars 3.36.26), that in a similar episode in 548, following Totila’s capture of the fortress of Roscianum, approximately 300 Roman soldiers defected to his side, choosing to oppose Belisarius.

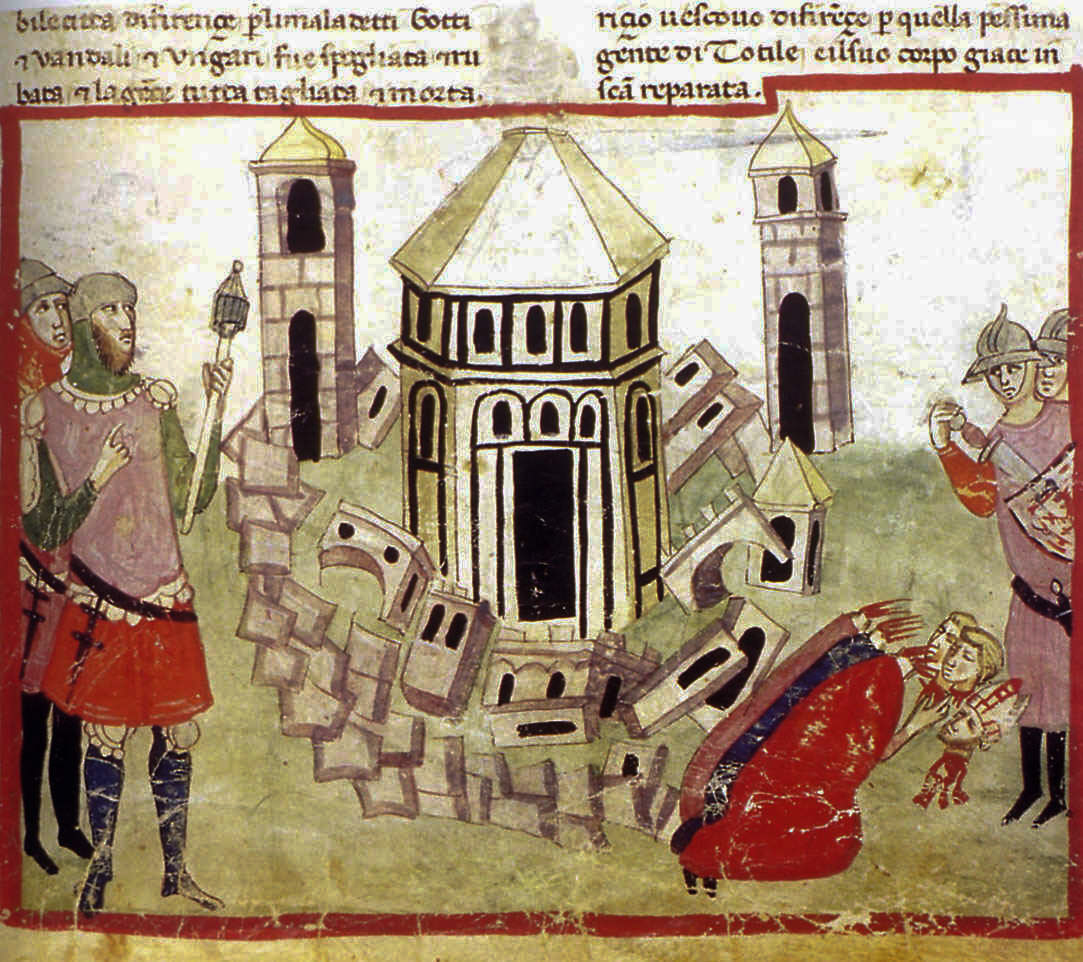
Totila razes the walls of Florence: illumination from the Chigi manuscript of Villani's Cronica

Totila's strategy was to move fast and take control of the countryside, leaving the Byzantine forces in control of well-defended cities, and especially the ports. When Belisarius eventually returned to Italy, Procopius relates that "during a space of five years he did not succeed once in setting foot on any part of the land ... except where some fortress was, but during this whole period he kept sailing about visiting one port after another." Totila circumvented those cities where a drawn-out siege would have been required, razing the walls of cities that capitulated to him, such as Beneventum. Totila's conquest of Italy was marked not only by celerity but also by mercy, and Gibbon says "none were deceived, either friends or enemies, who depended on his faith or his clemency." However, Totila could be merciless, as Procopius recounts. For instance, after a successful siege of a resisting city like Perugia, Totila had its bishop, Herculanus of Perugia, beheaded by a soldier (though originally planned to be flayed). Procopius left a written portrayal of Totila before his troops were drawn up for battle:

The armour in which he was clad was abundantly plated with gold and the ample adornments which hung from his cheek plates as well as his helmet and spear were not only purple, but in other respects befitting a king … And he himself, sitting upon a very large horse, began to dance under arms skillfully between the two armies. And as he rode he hurled his javelin into the air and caught it again as it quivered above him, then passed it rapidly from hand to hand, shifting it with consummate skill.

Where Totila learned this "dance" is never made clear by Procopius, but these actions likely meant something to the Goths and despite his firm conviction of coexistence with the Romans and their culture, Burns relates, much like Theodoric, he "remained a Goth." Despite his ethnic status as a Germanic warrior, Totila did not plunder the countryside for supplies like other barbarians had done; instead, he collected rent and taxes to provide the income he needed without ruining the cities and towns he captured. He also recruited slaves into the ranks of his army. (Note: On a couple of occasions, Procopius even praises Totila (Wars, 7.20.29–31 and 7.6.4) for having restrained his soldiers from raping captured women, which won him renown for his moderation.) While some sources, including Procopius, claim that Totila recruited slaves into his army, historian Marco Cristini suggests this may be an exaggeration intended to portray the Gothic forces as desperate or illegitimate. Although it is plausible that slaves were present within the Gothic military context, Cristini argues that their roles were likely limited to auxiliary functions such as cooking, maintaining equipment, laundering, and tending to the wounded, rather than participating directly in combat. He emphasises that Totila’s core military force primarily consisted of trained cavalrymen, skilled in the use of spears and accustomed to warfare from a young age. While it is not impossible that a small number of slaves may have taken up arms, Cristini contends that their lack of military training and the logistical challenges of equipping and preparing them for battle make widespread slave participation in combat unlikely, contrary to Procopius’s portrayal.

== Taking Naples ==
Procopius reported (Wars, 7.9–12) that during the next two campaigning seasons, Totila was able to take several strategically important centres, including the fortress at Auximum, which allowed him to cut off land communications between Rome and Ravenna. Additional strongholds at Caesena, Urbinus, Mons Feretris, Petra Pertusa, Campania, Lucania, Apulia, Bruttium, and Calabria also fell to Totila's forces, placing the Goths in command of nearly all of southern Italy. Following these successes, Totila now led his army to Naples, laying siege to the city, which alarmed Justinian. The emperor responded by sending the civilian Maximin to meet the crisis. When Maximin attempted a ploy and sent ample food supplies via ships to give the appearance of a much larger army, it failed as Totila was fully informed of all the facts. The crews were slain and a second effort was made to resupply Conon in Naples. Despite the ships arriving safely, the vessels were blown ashore by a gale and these crews were slain and General Demetrius—sent at Maximin's behest—was taken captive by Totila. The Gothic king had Demetrius's hands cut off and his tongue removed before turning him loose. Nonetheless, Totila offered generous terms to Conon's starving garrison at Naples and they opened their gates in the spring of 543 to the Goths. Historian J.B. Bury writes:

On this occasion Totila exhibited a considerable humanity which was not to be expected, as the historian Procopius remarks, from an enemy or a barbarian. He knew that if an abundance of food were at once supplied, the famished inhabitants would gorge themselves to death. He posted sentinels at the gates and in the harbor and allowed no one to leave the city. Then he dealt out small rations, gradually increasing the quantity every day until the people had recovered their strength. The terms of the capitulation were more than faithfully observed. Conon and his followers were embarked in ships with which the Goths provided them, and when, deciding to sail for Rome, they were hindered by contrary winds, Totila furnished horses, provisions, and guides so that they could make the journey by land.

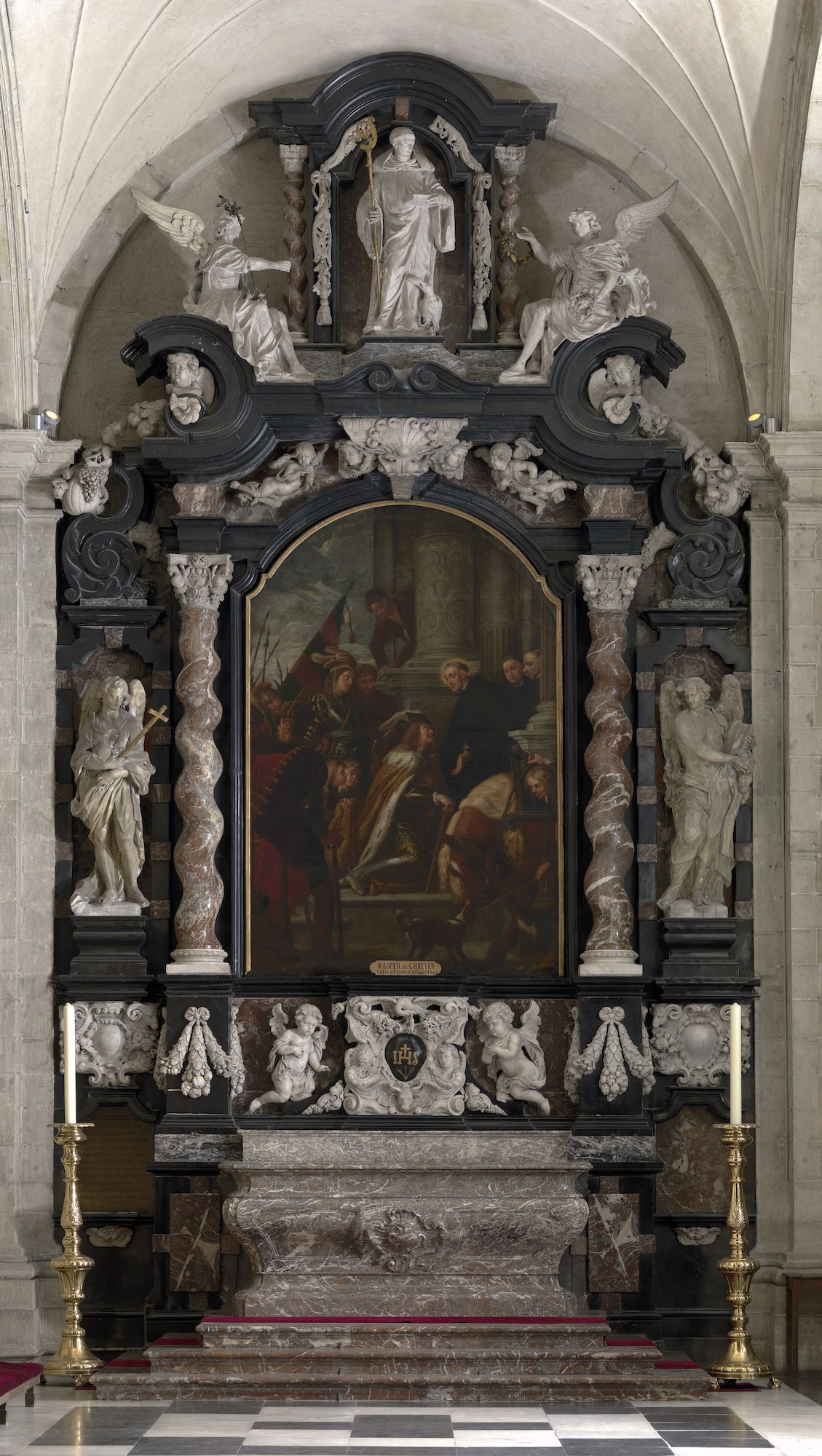
Saint Benedict receives Totila by Gaspar de Crayer in Saint Peter's Abbey Ghent

The fortifications at Naples were partly razed. (Note: Totila's meeting with Benedict of Nursia at Monte Cassino is preserved in Pope Gregory I's Dialogues (ii.14–15). It occurred either before or soon after the siege of Naples; the Benedictines' traditional date is 21 March 543. It includes a telling of the abbot's discernment of an aide of Totila's, his sword-bearer Riggio, dressed in royal robes, as an impostor, and also his predictions for Totila, who knelt to him. This event was a favourite subject for Italian painters.) Totila spent the following season establishing himself in the south and reducing pockets of resistance, besieging the Roman garrisons that remained at Hydruntum, all the while building pressure on Rome itself. Unpaid Imperial troops in central Italy made such poor reputations pillaging the countryside that when Totila turned his attention to taking Rome, he was able proudly to contrast Goth and Greek behaviour in his initial negotiations with the senate. Hearkening back to the rule of Theodoric and Amalasuintha as a reminder of more peaceful times between the two peoples, Totila tried to convince them to throw in their lot with the Goths. His olive branch was rejected, however, and all the Arian priests were expelled from Constantinople, on suspicion of possible collaboration as a Gothic fifth column.

== Siege of Rome ==
Realizing the gravity of the situation in 544, Justinian issued an edict known as the Pragmatic Sanction, designed to rebuild a working government at Ravenna, and that year he also sent Belisarius back to Italy to counter the growing Gothic threat. Unlike in the past, Belisarius was not graciously financed and so the general used some of his own funds to pay for his journey to Italy. By May 544, both Belisarius and General Vitalius—and a contingent of a mere 4,000 troops—had passed through Thrace and were encamped at Salonia along the Adriatic coast. Meanwhile, Totila was preparing to capture Rome.

Throughout the occupation of Italy, Totila never really wavered from the aim to recover the kingdom and sovereignty for the Goths (Procopius, Wars, 7.1.26), but not solely under those auspices, as historian Walter Goffart suggests; he avows it was also to become "subcontractors in upholding the nomen Romanum in Italy."

Towards the end of 545, the Gothic king took up his station at Tivoli and prepared to starve Rome into surrender, making at the same time elaborate preparations for checking the progress of Belisarius who was advancing to its relief, and whose fleet almost managed to relieve the city. In December 545, Totila besieged Rome and a year later entered and plundered the city, where he prayed at St. Peter's Basilica, suggesting continuity with Theodoric, but the act was near meaningless since the city was practically empty.

Once the siege of the city was complete, Totila planned to raze the city, but Belisarius sent a message and convinced him otherwise, claiming that judgments into posterity would follow Totila if he did, so the latter refrained. Instead, Totila abandoned the city and took some of the Senate members hostage with him; meanwhile the great metropolis sat abandoned for some forty days. (Note: Within the catacombs of Rome, one still finds inscriptions that conflate the Goths and Getae, and which also depict Totlila's siege of Rome in classical terms as an attack by heretical barbarians who plundered the tombs of the saints.)

By April 546, Belisarius had retaken the city and Totila's initial effort to wrest it from the Roman general failed. However, as masters of Italy, the Goths controlled much of the peninsula and in 549, an Ostrogothic fleet "ravaged the coast of Campania" and Rome too fell to Totila in January 550. More determined than ever to regain Italy, Justinian sent his nephew Germanus, whose marriage to a Gothic princess attracted German recruits, but he died on the eve of the expedition. Justinian replaced him with his son-in-law, John, and his son Justinian. John's forces to relieve a Roman garrison at Ancona were successful as were his warships at a battle along the anchorage of Sena Gallica, providing the Roman navy with control of the Adriatic and the Mediterranean. According to historian Archibald Ross Lewis, the Byzantine victory at Sena Gallica was completely decisive, with some 36 of 47 Gothic ships destroyed. Meanwhile, one of Totila's Gothic admirals, Gibal, was captured. These developments proved important for subsequent campaigns, as it was necessary to end Totila's sea dominance before any land invasions could be properly conducted.

== Death ==
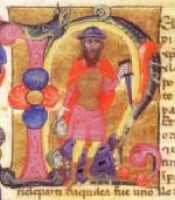
Totila in the 14th-century Nuova Cronica

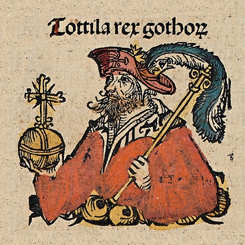
Totila in the Nuremberg Chronicle, 1493

Totila's next exploit was the conquest and plunder of Sicily, after which he subdued Corsica and Sardinia and sent a Gothic fleet against the coasts of Greece. By this time the emperor Justinian I was taking energetic measures to check the Goths, assembling a large army and sending his navy against Totila's fleet, which it defeated in 551. The conduct of a new campaign on land was entrusted to the eunuch Narses, who took advantage of the lessening intensity of the Persian War and added contingents of Lombards, Gepids, and Heruls to his allied forces.

Leading troops into Ravenna, Narses was able to challenge Totila at the Battle of Taginae (also known as the Battle of Busta Gallorum) near Sentinum. Ordered to charge with spears alone, the Gothic cavalry drove straight into the crossfire of Narses's flanking archers and broke; by nightfall Totila was in flight with only a handful of companions—among them the Gothic officer Scipuar—pursued by Romans who did not yet know whom they were chasing. One of them, the Gepid officer Asbados, closed on the fleeing king and drove his spear into Totila's back, then was himself wounded in the foot by Scipuar and abandoned the chase. Mortally wounded, Totila was carried a further eighty-four stades by his escort to a village called Caprae; there he died shortly after arrival, and his followers buried him and dispersed. For a king who had ruled the Goths for eleven years and reversed the fortunes of an entire war, Prokopios—who transmits this version—implied that the end was not worthy of the achievements that preceded it. A second account circulated among his contemporaries as well: that Totila, dressed as an ordinary soldier so as not to draw attack, was struck instead by a stray arrow during the retreat, and rode as far as Caprae before succumbing to the wound. Either way, Rome learned of it only belatedly—not from the battlefield, but from a Gothic woman who disclosed the grave's location; the Romans, doubting her, dug up the body to confirm it was Totila before burying him again and reporting to Narses.

A similar battle followed a few months later under his successor and relative Teia, who died in combat as well during the Battle of Mons Lactarius. Another army—roughly 75,000 strong and consisting of Franks and Alemanni—still existed as did the threat to Italy, and despite the entry of these forces into the Po Valley and their ravaging of Italy for a time, Narses eventually brought them to heel. Meanwhile, the land held by the Gothic church was transferred to the Roman church in Italy and land owned by the Gothic kings went to the emperor.

== Aftermath ==
For the Byzantines, the war officially ended in 554, which was followed by the broad promulgation of Justinian's Pragmatic Sanction. One of the stipulations Justinian made clear in this document was the validation of all edicts made by "legitimate" kings and those from the Roman people or Senate, while those from Totila—deemed a "most abominable tyrant"—were rendered void. The Justinian Code was also retroactively made applicable throughout Italy. Socially, the country was disrupted by the actions of the Goths Witigis, Totila, and Teia, who had collectively fractured the Senate's social standing and the servant-based economy by liberating slaves and coloni. Over the longer term, this also meant that western senators were seen as inferior to their eastern counterparts, which in some ways further contributed to the Byzantine's ascendancy. (Note: As scholar Christine Radtki relates, "While the senatorial elite had been visible in so many aspects of public life and had upheld Roman traditions, the Gothic War deprived it of economic means, and thus of the foundation for its political and social engagement. So, with the end of the Ostrogothic reign on Italian soil, the oldest Roman institution was irreparably damaged.")

Nevertheless, the country was so ravaged by the war that any return to normal life proved impossible and Rome, having suffered through seventeen-years' worth of bitter fighting during the Gothic wars, had been besieged and captured multiple times. French historian Bertrand Lançon described this period of late antiquity as Rome's "darkest hours." In 568, only three years after Justinian's death, most of the country was conquered by Alboin of the Lombards, who absorbed the remaining Ostrogothic population, becoming the heirs of the Ostrogoths in Italy itself.

== In fiction ==
Totila is portrayed by Robert Hoffmann in the 1968 film The Last Roman.

== Bibliography ==
- Amory, Patrick (1997). People and Identity in Ostrogothic Italy, 494–554. Cambridge and New York: Cambridge University Press. ISBN 0-521-57151-0.
- Bradley, Henry (1903). The Story of the Goths. New York: G.P. Putnam's Sons. OCLC 22980897.
- Burns, Thomas (1991). A History of the Ostrogoths. Bloomington; Indianapolis: Indiana University Press. ISBN 978-0-25320-600-8.
- Bury, J.B. (1958). History of the Later Roman Empire: From the Death of Theodosius I to the Death of Justinian. Vol. II. New York: Dover Publications Inc. OCLC 62206973.
- Cristini, Marco (2022). Baduila: Politics and Warfare at the End of Ostrogothic Italy. Istituzioni e società (Prima edizione ed.). Spoleto: Fondazione Centro italiano di studi sull'alto Medioevo. ISBN 978-8-86809-365-5.
- Croke, Brian (1987). "Cassiodorus and the Getica of Jordanes". Classical Philology. 82 (2): 117–134. doi:10.1086/367034. S2CID 162232630.
- Elton, Hugh (2018). The Roman Empire in Late Antiquity: A Political and Military History. Cambridge and New York: Cambridge University Press. ISBN 978-1-10845-631-9.
- Gibbon, Sir Edward (1841) [1789]. The Decline and Fall of the Roman Empire. Vol. III. New York: Harper and Brothers.
- Goffart, Walter (2006). Barbarian Tides: The Migration Age and the Later Roman Empire. Philadelphia: University of Pennsylvania Press. ISBN 978-0-81222-105-3.
- Halsall, Guy (2007). Barbarian Migrations and the Roman West, 376–568. Cambridge and New York: Cambridge University Press. ISBN 978-0-52143-543-7.
- Hanson, Victor Davis (2014). The Savior Generals. New York: Bloomsbury Press. ISBN 978-1-60819-342-4.
- Heather, Peter (1996). The Goths. Oxford and Malden, MA: Blackwell. ISBN 978-0-63116-536-1.
- Heather, Peter (2013). The Restoration of Rome: Barbarian Popes and Imperial Pretenders. Oxford and New York: Oxford University Press. ISBN 978-0-19936-851-8.
- Heather, Peter (2018). Rome Resurgent: War and Empire in the Age of Justinian. Oxford and New York: Oxford University Press. ISBN 978-0-19936-274-5.
- Herrin, Judith (2020). Ravenna: Capital of Empire, Crucible of Europe. Princeton and Oxford: Princeton University Press. ISBN 978-0-69115-343-8.
- Heydemann, Gerda (2016). "The Ostrogothic Kingdom: Ideologies and Transitions". In Jonathan J. Arnold; M. Shane Bjornlie; Kristina Sessa (eds.). A Companion to Ostrogothic Italy. Leiden and Boston: Brill. ISBN 978-9004-31376-7.
- Hughes, Ian (2009). Belisarius: The Last Roman General. Yardley, PA: Pen & Sword Books. ISBN 978-1-84468-941-5.
- Lançon, Bertrand (2001). Rome in Late Antiquity: AD 312–609. New York: Routledge. ISBN 978-0-41592-975-2.
- Lewis, Archibald (1951). Naval Power and Trade in the Mediterranean. Princeton: Princeton University Press. OCLC 221914130.
- Mitchell, Stephen (2007). A History of the Later Roman Empire, AD 284–641. Oxford and Malden, MA: Wiley Blackwell. ISBN 978-1-40510-856-0.
- Moorhead, John (2006). "The Byzantines in the West in the Sixth Century". In Paul Fouracre (ed.). The New Cambridge Medieval History. Vol. I [c. 500–c. 700]. Cambridge; New York: Cambridge University Press. ISBN 978-0-52136-291-7.
- Parnell, David Alan (2017). Justinian's Men: Careers and Relationships of Byzantine Army Officers, 518–610. London: Palgrave Macmillan. ISBN 978-1-13756-203-6.
- Prokopios (2014). The Wars of Justinian. Translated by H. B. Dewing. New York: Indianapolis; Cambridge. ISBN 978-1-62466-172-3.
- Radtki, Christine (2016). "The Senate at Rome in Ostrogothic Italy". In Jonathan J. Arnold; M. Shane Bjornlie; Kristina Sessa (eds.). A Companion to Ostrogothic Italy. Leiden and Boston: Brill. ISBN 978-9004-31376-7.
- Ward, Allen; Heichelheim, Fritz; Yeo, Cedric (2016). A History of the Roman People. London and New York: Routledge. ISBN 978-0-205-84679-5.
- Wolfram, Herwig (1988). History of the Goths. Berkeley and Los Angeles: University of California Press. ISBN 0-520-05259-5.

=== Online ===
- Procopius. "The Secret History". University of Chicago – Penelope.
- Procopius. "The Wars of Procopius". University of Chicago – Penelope.

Regnal titles
Preceded by Eraric	King of the Ostrogoths; 541–552	Succeeded by Teia
