= Siege of Rome (549–550) =

Siege during Justinian's Gothic War

- Part of the Gothic War (535–554)
- Main army movements during the second phase of the Gothic War
| Date | June 549 – 16 January 550 |
| Location | Rome, Italy |
| Result | Ostrogothic victory |
| Territorial changes | Ostrogoths captured Rome |

Belligerents
| Byzantine Empire | Ostrogoths |

Commanders and leaders
| Diogenes | Totila |

Strength
| 3,000 | Unknown |

In 549–550 AD, Rome was besieged for the third time during the Gothic War (535–554), as Byzantine forces defended against an Ostrogothic (Goths) army under their King Totila.

Within the first five years of the war, the Byzantines had conquered much of Italy, culminating in the capture of the capital of the Gothic kingdom in 540. However, corruption and harsh taxation reignited Gothic resistance under Totila, who reversed many Byzantine territorial gains in a few years.

In June 549, Totila besieged Rome, facing a Byzantine garrison of about 3,000 troops under Diogenes, who prepared for a prolonged defense with stored food. Totila imposed a blockade to starve the Byzantine garrison. Discontented defenders, unhappy over years of unpaid wages, accepted promises made by him and opened the gate to the Goths on 16 January 550. A massacre followed, and although residents tried to escape, many of them were killed in ambushes. A Byzantine cavalry unit briefly resisted from the Tomb of Hadrian, but the terms Totila offered persuaded most of them to enter his service. Determined not to lose Rome again, Totila settled Goths in the city and brought the imprisoned senators from Campania back to reside there.

== Primary sources ==
Procopius of Caesarea is the major Greek historian of Late Antiquity and the main source for Justinian's reign. In the Books V–VIII of the Wars, Procopius described the Gothic War (535–554), and it is largely paraphrased by modern scholarship as it is the sole source that covered these events. He was Belisarius's assessor, being an eyewitness to military engagements, having access to official information, and knowledge of military affairs. These advantages placed him in a unique position to reconstruct the wars in the East, Africa, and Italy. He adopted a classical style in narrating the events, inspired by historians such as Thucydides and Herodotus, by prioritizing speeches, moral explanation, and dramatic structure over strict documentary accuracy.

Procopius's work is largely factual, and even though he was on the Byzantine side, it is neither entirely neutral nor propaganda. He portrayed Belisarius favorably over other Byzantine commanders, reflecting personal loyalty, and disproportionately emphasized mounted combat, marginalizing the role of infantry in battles and sieges. His view of Justinian ranges from enthusiasm and optimism in the first part of the Wars to open hostility in the Secret History. Even in the Wars, there is a transition at the point when Belisarius left Italy in mid-summer 540 AD, presumably due to Belisarius's unbroken loyalty to Justinian, followed by the resurgence Gothic resistance led by charismatic Totila, who became the protagonist and a tragic hero in Procopius's narrative in the latter part of the Gothic War.

== Background ==
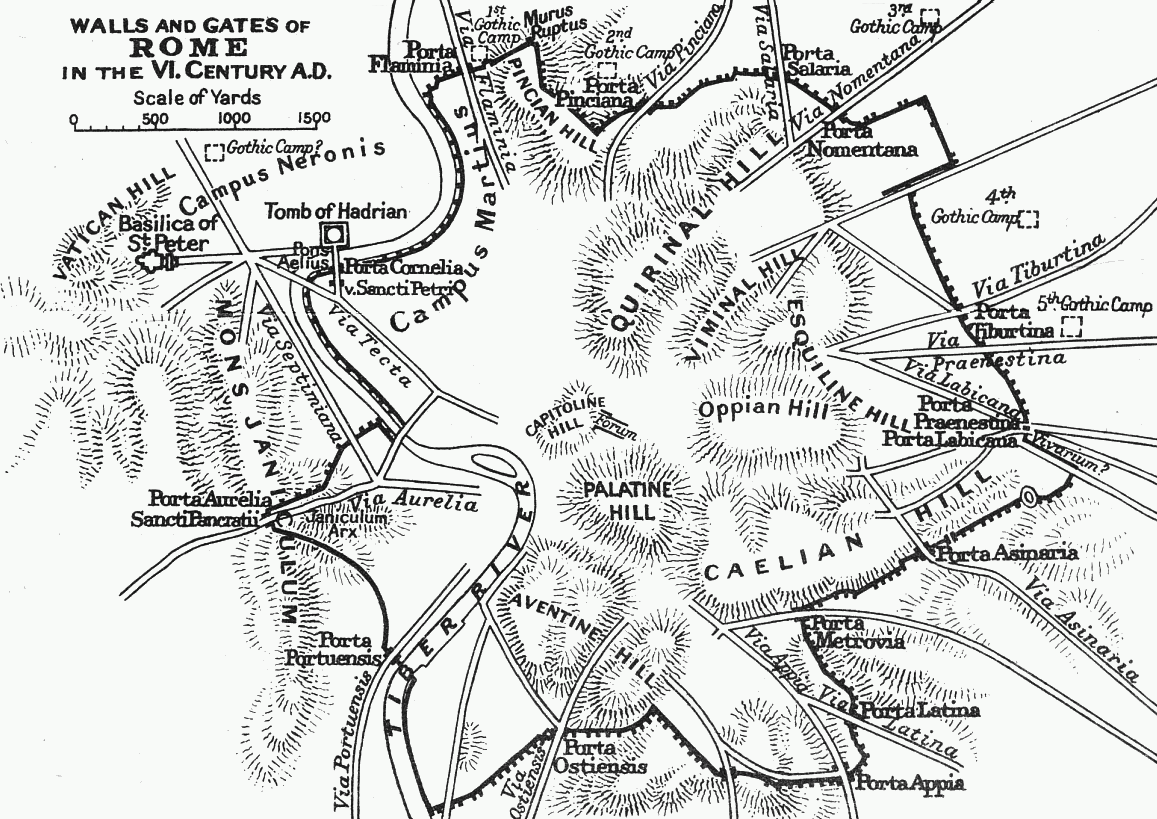
Walls and gates of Rome, 6th century. Totila and his men entered via the Porta Asinaria, in the southeast.

Following the fall of Ravenna in May 540 AD, Belisarius restored Sicily and most of the Italian Peninsula to Byzantine rule. His stratagem to compel the Goths to surrender by offering Totila the Western imperial crown alarmed Emperor Justinian, who recalled Belisarius to Constantinople with Ravenna's treasury and the captive king Vitiges but denied him a triumph and reassigned him to the eastern front in advance of the Lazic War (541–562). Belisarius was replaced by three coequal commanders, whose rivalry and corruption led to indiscipline and plundering of the Italian countryside. Justinian's harsh tax audit to recover alleged Gothic-era arrears, combined with reduced rewards for wounded and distinguished soldiers, further alienated troops and civilians, collapsing morale and eroding Italian loyalty.

Byzantine misrule strengthened the Goths under King Ildibad, who defeated a Byzantine force at the Battle of Treviso and recovered much of the Po Valley. His reign was short-lived because he was assassinated before consolidating his power. The reign of Eraric followed, but it ended with his murder in late 541, because he secretly offered to abdicate and hand over the kingdom to the Byzantines in exchange for the rank of patrician and a large payment. Because of the turmoil among the Gothic aristocracy, Ildibad's nephew Totila became king.

Totila steadily expanded his control over Italy by combining military success with conciliatory policies toward the Italian population, presenting himself as a liberator from Byzantine exactions. In the meantime, a plague (541–549) weakened the Byzantine empire's ability to field armies, and one third of its population was killed. By 543–544, much of southern and central Italy had fallen under Gothic control, leaving Byzantine control confined to a few fortified cities. Rome, poorly supplied and neglected by imperial authorities, was blockaded and captured by Totila in December 546, following famine and internal betrayal. Although the city was partially depopulated and its defenses deteriorated, Totila refrained from destroying it, seeking to exploit its symbolic value in negotiations. He offered peace to Justinian on moderate terms, proposing recognition of Gothic rule in Italy in exchange for nominal imperial suzerainty; Justinian rejected these overtures. Totila lost control of Rome in 547 by a swift Byzantine counter-offensive while he was away from the city. With diplomacy exhausted and Byzantine relief efforts faltering, Totila again besieged Rome in June 549.

== Siege ==
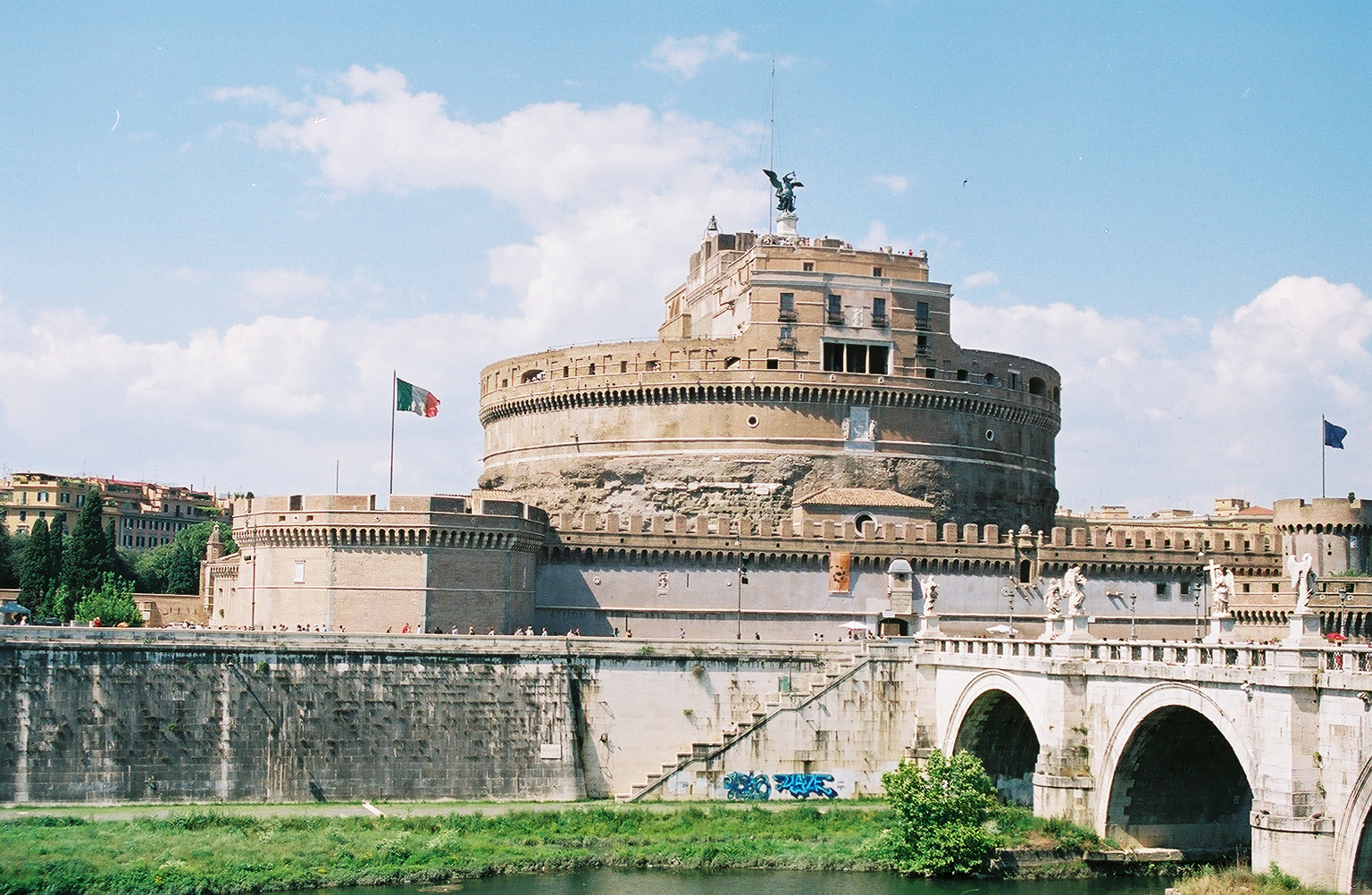
The Mausoleum of Hadrian where a Byzantine cavalry detachment was trapped

In June 549, Totila marched his main army against Rome and chose to blockade the city. It was defended by 3,000 selected troops under Diogenes, a former bodyguard of Belisarius appointed before his departure. Although Byzantine forces were stationed at Portus and Centumcellae, the nearby harbors of Rome, they failed to provide effective support in the defense of Rome. Diogenes had grain planted throughout the city within the walls, ensuring a food supply, and he enforced strict discipline. Repeated Gothic assaults were repelled. However, the situation worsened when the Goths captured Portus, cutting off Byzantine access to supplies.

After a long siege, some Isaurian guards at the Gate of St. Paul, angry over years of unpaid wages and envious of fellow Isaurians rewarded by Totila, secretly agreed to betray Rome. Totila had encouraged this by using Isaurians in his army to flaunt their success. On the night of 16 January 550, the Goths staged a diversion by sending boats along the river Tiber and sounding trumpets, diverting the Byzantine defenders away from their positions. The Isaurians then opened the gate, allowing the Goths to enter.

Upon taking the city, the Goths massacred a significant number of citizens, further reducing the population of Rome that was already a shadow of its former self. Some citizens escaped in the dark; however, many of those fleeing toward Centumcellae were killed in ambushes. Diogenes survived despite being wounded. A Byzantine commander, Paulus, and his 400 horsemen held the Tomb of Hadrian and repelled a Gothic assault at dawn. Totila then chose to starve them. The defenders only had their horses as a food source, but instead of eating them, they prepared to die fighting. Totila observed this and offered them generous terms: surrender and leave unarmed, or join his army with their property. Distrusting the first option and resentful over unpaid wages, most chose to enter Gothic service. Only Paulus and one Isaurian departed, while another 300 soldiers who had taken refuge in churches also joined Totila.

== Aftermath ==
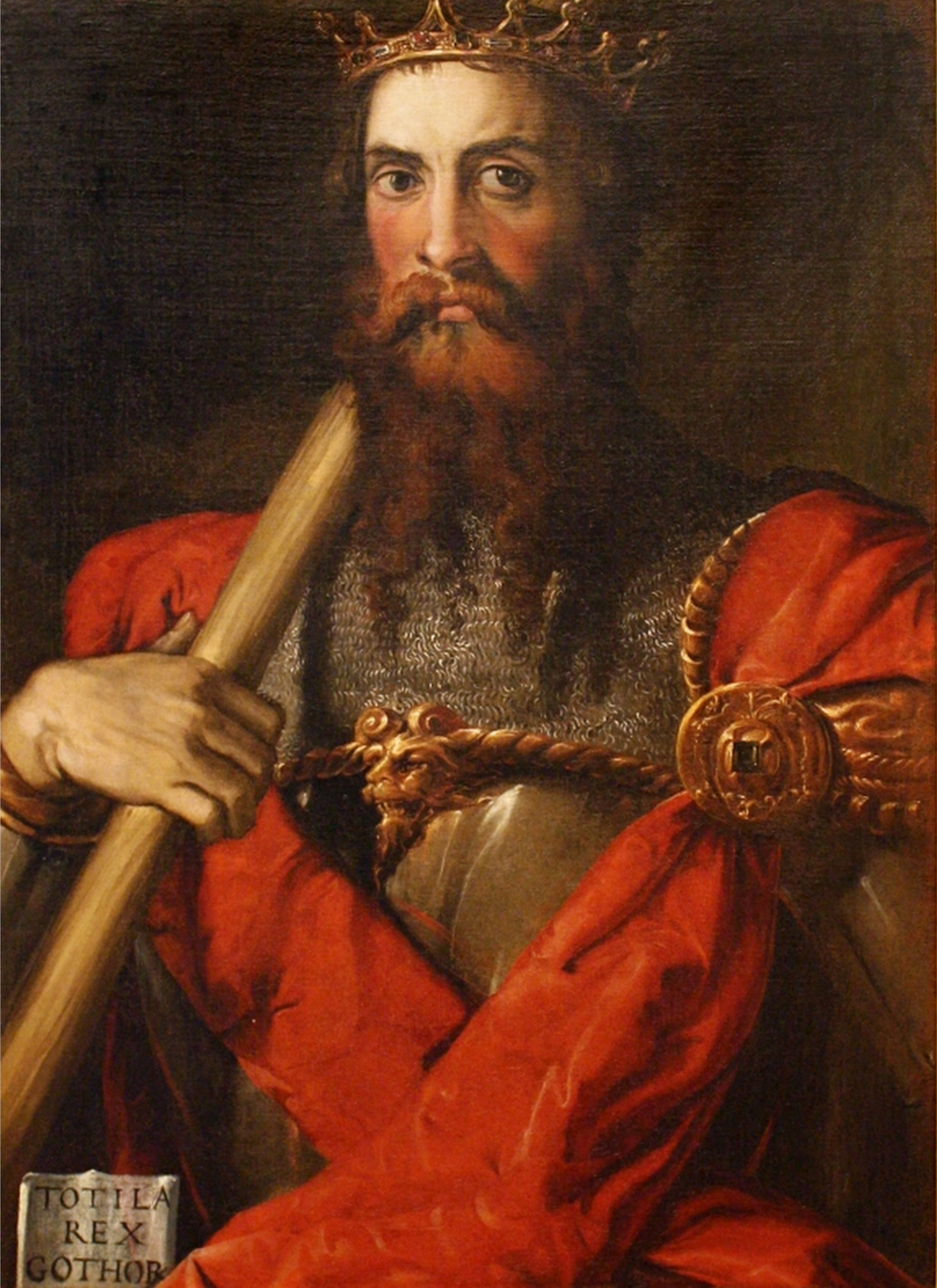
Totila by Francesco Salviati, c. 1549

Totila was determined not to lose Rome again. He settled Goths in the city and brought back the Senate, along with senators and other captives held in Campania. Totila holding Rome as the capital of his kingdom strengthened his legitimacy. According to contemporary historian Procopius, he did so because a Frankish king refused him a marriage alliance, claiming he was not truly king of Italy without Rome. Totila staged horse races and presided over them in imperial fashion, before preparing his army for a campaign against Sicily.

As early as 549 and after the arrival of Belisarius from Italy to Constantinople, Emperor Justinian planned to dispatch an army to Italy; Procopius believes that it was possible for the emperor to save Rome if he acted without delays. Initially, Justinian assigned the elderly patrician Liberius from Rome to this task, but then he got distracted by religious matters and lost interest. Upon the news of Rome's fall, Justinian assigned his cousin, Germanus, to start recruiting an army. Germanus's sudden death in 550 resulted in a temporary postponement as Justinian delayed in selecting a replacement for the commander-in-chief for the campaign. During 550–551, an expeditionary force was gradually assembled at Salona in Dalmatia, comprising regular Byzantine units and several contingents of foreign allies, notably Lombards, Heruls, and Bulgars. The Byzantine Chamberlain (Cubicularius) Narses was appointed to command in mid–551.

Narses moved by land to Italy and headed straight to Rome, forcing Totila to intercept him. At the Battle of Taginae, the Goths were defeated, and Totila was mortally wounded. Narses and his troops entered Rome in July 552 or 553, and the keys of its gates were delivered to Justinian. In 553, the new king of the Goths, Teias, was defeated and killed at the Battle of Mons Lactarius (near Mount Vesuvius) by Byzantines under Narses. After this, the Goths failed to appoint a new king, exposing the fragility of their remaining power. In October 552, Narses captured Rome with little resistance.
