= Battle of Treviso =

Battle during the Gothic War (535–554)

- Part of the Gothic War (535–554)
- Main army movements during the second phase of the Gothic War
| Date | 540/541 AD |
| Location | Outside Treviso, Italy 45.66°N 12.22°E |
| Result | Ostrogothic victory |

Belligerents
| Byzantine Empire | Ostrogothic Kingdom |

Commanders and leaders
| Vitalius; Theudimundus | Ildibad |
- Location within Italy Battle of Treviso (Mediterranean)

The Battle of Treviso or Battle of Tarbesium was an engagement in 540/541 AD between Ostrogoths (Goths) and Byzantines during the Gothic War (535–554).

Following the departure of Byzantine general Belisarius after his conquest of the Italian Peninsula, the newly crowned King Ildibad reorganized the remaining Goths and sought to take the initiative. Justinian's aggressive taxation and the corruption among the remaining Byzantine leadership fueled the Gothic cause. Byzantine commander Vitalius, acting independently of the divided leadership, sought to counter the Goths before they became strong enough to pose a threat. Vitalius marched with Byzantine troops and a contingent of Heruli soldiers against Ildibad. At Treviso, the Goths won a decisive victory, forcing Vitalius to flee with only a few survivors and killing the Heruli leader. This success allowed Ildibad to extend his authority across the Po Valley. However, his subsequent actions angered the Goths, which led to his assassination.

== Prelude ==
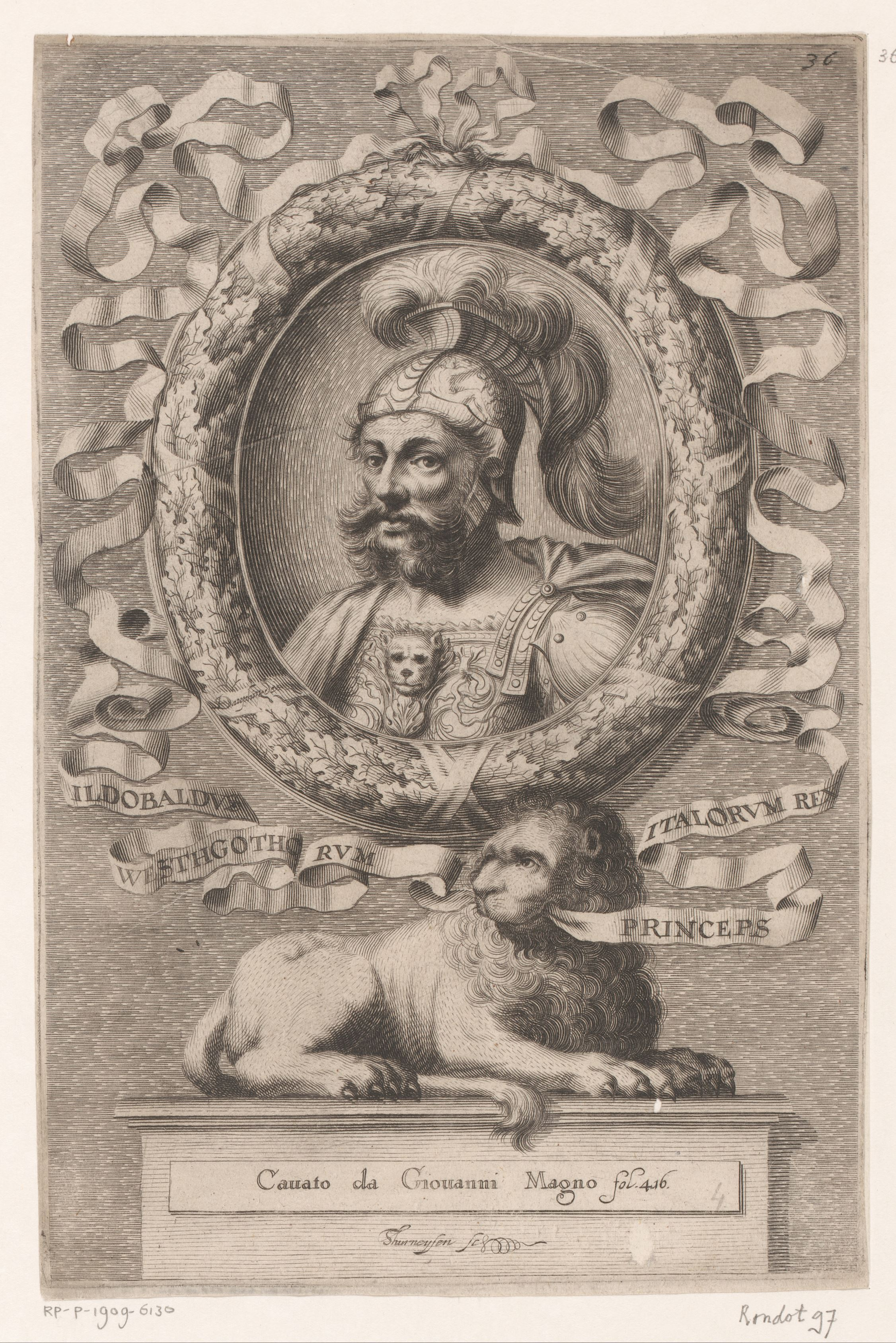
Engraving of Ildibad. From Emanuele Tesauro. Del regno d'Italia sotto i barbari.

Following the fall of Ravenna in May 540 AD, the capital of the Gothic kingdom, Belisarius had succeeded in restoring former Western Roman territories (Sicily and most of the Italian Peninsula) to Byzantine rule. However, his stratagem of inducing the Goths to surrender by offering him the Western Roman imperial crown had spooked Byzantine Emperor Justinian. Although Belisarius returned to Constantinople in mid-summer 540 with the Ravenna's treasury and the defeated Gothic King Vitiges as prisoner, Justinian refused him a triumph. The general's departure was also needed on the eastern front against the Persians in the upcoming Lazic War (541–562).

Justinian replaced Belisarius with three commanders, equal in authority: Bessas, John the Sanguinary, and Constantinianus. The three commanders fell into rivalry and turned to plundering the Italian population instead of fighting the remaining Goths. This lawless behavior eroded discipline, alienated their troops, and quickly destroyed Italian loyalty to the empire. The situation worsened when Justinian sent Alexander to Italy; he was a corrupt auditor known as "the Snips" (Greek: Ψαλίδιος) for cutting off the edges around gold coins to enrich himself and the emperor favored him for being able to save significant state expenses. At Ravenna, Alexander imposed a harsh tax audit, forcing Italians to pay alleged arrears from Gothic rule, and cut soldiers' rewards for wounds and bravery, which further alienated civilians and demoralized the army.

== Battle ==
The withdrawal of Belisarius from Italy also prompted the newly crowned Gothic King Ildibad to take initiative. He began to attract to his side both barbarian fighters and Byzantine soldiers willing to desert, assembling an army of 1,000 horsemen. At first, he controlled only the town Ticinum, but the Byzantine commanders' abuses was progressively supported by the people of Liguria and Venetia. While the other Byzantine leaders were paralyzed by infighting and demoralized troops, Vitalius acted against the advancing Goths as they moved into Venetia, a region under his control. The region feared that further delays would allow the Goths to grow too strong and threaten him.

In 540/541 AD, Vitalius commanded a large, mixed army that included a sizable number of Heruli, marched and engaged Ildibad outside Treviso. The battle ended with a decisive victory for Ildibad. Vitalius lost most of his army but escaped with a small group, including Theudimundus, son of Mauricius and grandson of Mundus. The Heruls suffered heavy losses, among them their commander Visandus. This victory established Ildibad's reputation and brought him to Justinian's attention for the first time.

== Aftermath ==
Ildibad was subsequently able to extend his authority across the entire Po Valley. However, the Gothic success was short-lived. Soon afterward, Ildibad murdered Uraias, the nephew of Vitiges, over a personal insult exchanged between their wives. According to contemporary Procopius, Uraias's wife entered the baths where the queen was present and deliberately ignored her, after which the queen complained to Ildibad. The severity of the punishment enraged the Goths, since Uraias had earlier refused the Gothic crown and deferred to Ildibad prior to Belisarius's departure, and many Goths plotted against him. Procopius added that Ildibad was later killed for a different reason: he arranged the marriage of a woman desired by Velas the Gepid, one of his bodyguards. During a dinner, Velas beheaded him. Some Goths suspected that Velas was merely the instrument of a broader plot. The Byzantines were unable to exploit this turmoil, as their own leadership was divided.

The Goths were initially unable to agree on a successor. The issue was resolved when the Rugians of Odovacar, who had submitted to Theoderic but retained a distinct identity in northern Italy, seized the opportunity to proclaim Eraric, their leading figure, as king. Although the Goths resented this presumption, they nevertheless recognized Eraric and tolerated his rule for five months, because they could not agree on a more suitable candidate among themselves. Eraric called a council and won Gothic approval to send an embassy to Constantinople. In secret, however, he chose his own agents and instructed them to tell Justinian that, in return for the rank of patrician and a large payment, he would abdicate and surrender northern Italy to the empire. In late 541, Eraric was assassinated, and in his place, the nephew of Ildibad, Totila, took the throne and embarked on the reconquest of the Italian Peninsula from Byzantine control over the next decade.

== Sources ==
=== Primary ===
- Procopius (1924) [545–553 AD]. Procopius: History of the Wars, Books VI and VII. Translated by Dewing, Henry Bronson. Cambridge, Massachusetts: Harvard University Press. OCLC 50817920.

=== Secondary ===
- Bäuml, Franz H.; Birnbaum, Marianna D. (1993). Attila The Man and His Image. Budapest: Corvina Press. ISBN 9789631335958.
- Bury, John Bagnell (1958) [1923]. History of the Later Roman Empire: From the Death of Theodosius I to the Death of Justinian. Vol. 2. Mineola, New York: Dover Publications, Inc. OCLC 1240424678.
- Heather, Peter J. (2018). Rome Resurgent: War and Empire in the Age of Justinian. Oxford: Oxford University Press. ISBN 9780199362745.
- Hughes, Ian (2009). Belisarius: The Last Roman General. Yardley, PA: Westholme Publishing. ISBN 9781594160851. OCLC 294885267.
- Martindale, J. R. (1992). The Prosopography of the Later Roman Empire 2 Part Set: Volume 3, AD 527-641. Cambridge and New York: Cambridge University Press. ISBN 978-0-521-20160-5.
- Syvänne, Ilkka (2021). Military History of Late Rome 518–565. Yorkshire, PA: Pen and Sword Military. ISBN 978-1-4738-9530-0.
- Treadgold, Warren (1997). A History of the Byzantine State and Society. Stanford: The Stanford Press. ISBN 978-0-80-472630-6.
- Tucker, Spencer C. (2009). A Global Chronology of Conflict: From the Ancient World to the Modern Middle East: From the Ancient World to the Modern Middle East. Santa Barbara, Denver, and London: ABC-CLIO. ISBN 978-1851096725.
