= Theudimund =

Byzantine official

Theodimundus or Theudimund (Latin: Theodimundus; Greek: Θευδιμούνδος; fl. 541) was a Byzantine official of Barbarian origins.

== Biography ==
Theodimundus was the son of strategos (and likely MVM vacans) Mauricius, a son of magister militum Mundus, himself a possible descendant of Attila the Hun.

He belonged to the barbarian military aristocracy fighting for the Byzantines in the Balkans. Theodimundus was active during the reign of Emperor Justinian (r. 527–565). As a young man (by 540/541), he served in the Byzantine army during the Gothic War of 535-554 under Vitalius. He participated in the Battle of Treviso against the Gothic king Hildebad and barely escaped with his life, fleeing with his commander after the Byzantine defeat.
