= Aruth =

Byzantine official

Aruth (Greek: Αρούθ; fl. 553) was a Byzantine official of Herul origin, active under Emperor Justinian (r. 527–565). It is known that he was married to the unnamed daughter of Mauricius, son of magister militum Mundus. A renowned soldier, he led his fellow Heruli during the expedition to the Ostrogothic Kingdom led by Narses in 552. Upon the death of Fulcarius, he received great support to become the new leader of the Heruli. However, Narses eventually appointed fellow Herul Sindual in preference to him.
