= Mauricius (Gepid general) =

Gepid general fighting for the Byzantine Empire

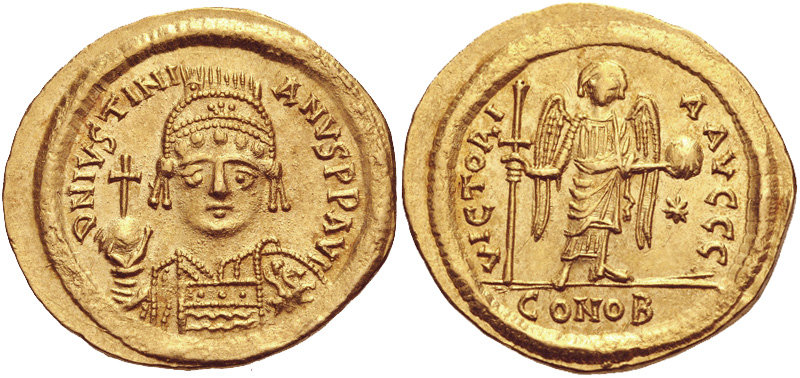
Coin of Emperor Justinian I, in whose army Mauricius fought

Mauricius (Greek: Μαυρίκιος; born before 520–536) was a Gepid general fighting for the Byzantine Empire. He was the son of Magister militium Mundus. He was presumably an MVM vacans.

== Biography ==
Mauricius was the son of Mundus (Mundo), himself possibly a grandson of Attila, king of the Huns. He was a strategos, a military general, in the Byzantine Empire. In 529, he went to Constantinople with his father, where he received gifts from the Byzantine Emperor Justinian I.

In 532 he fought in the Nika riots on the side of the Byzantines. In January of that year he commanded his troops in the hippodrome massacre, which ended the riots.

In 535, he and his father took part in the Gothic War. That year, he and his father sailed out to Dalmatia, where Mundus led his army against the Goths, while Belisarius invaded Italy. His father defeated the Goths, taking the capital of Salona. The next year, a Gothic army arrived, to reconquer the lost province. He ran across the Gothic army while on a scouting expedition with just a few men with him. He was trapped by the Goths and killed in the ensuing skirmish, after a fierce fight. His enraged father sailed out and defeated the Goths, but, too eager in the following pursuit, he was mortally wounded.

== Legacy ==
His son Theudimund was part of the barbarian military aristocracy, and fought the Ostrogoths in the Battle of Treviso in 540.

== Family ==
Mauricius was the son of the Gepid general Mundus and an unknown woman. He had the following offspring:

- Theudimund
- Anonyma, who married Aruth the Herul
