= Mundus (magister militum) =

Byzantine army officer

- Μοῦνδος, Mundo
- Died: 536
- Children: Mauricius
- Relatives: Giesmus; Attila?
- Military career
- Allegiance: Byzantine Empire
- Rank: General
- Conflicts: Nika revolt; Gothic War (535–554); Siege of Salona

Mundus or Mundo (Greek: Μοῦνδος; Moundos, Latin: Mundo; died 536) was a Barbarian commander of Gepid, Hun, and/or Gothic origins. He appears to have been the son of the Gepid king Giesmus. In the early 500s he commanded a group of bandits in Pannonia, eventually allying himself to the Ostrogothic king Theodoric the Great. After Theodoric's death in 526, Mundus entered service under Byzantine Emperor Justinian I, fighting in the Balkans, defending Justinian during the Nika riots, and fighting in the first stage of the Gothic War, during which he died in 536.

== Etymology ==
Mundus's name is attested as Latin: Mundo in Jordanes and Marcellinus Comes and as Greek: Μοῦνδος (Mundus) in Greek sources. The differences between the Greek and Latin names are unusual and Gerhard Doerfer suspects that the Greek name has been partially Hellenized.

Omeljan Pritsak argues that Mundus's name had the same Turkic etymology as proposed by Gyula Németh and László Rásonyi for Attila's father Mundzuk, from Turkic *munʒu ("jewel, pearl; flag"). (Note: For Turkic *munʒu, Finnish linguist Aulis J. Joki (apud Pritsak, 1982) proposes Old Chinese etymology: from 璊, OC:*‍mwən ~ *muən (Karlgren) ~ *mu:n (ZS), mod. mén "red gem" and 珠, OC:*‍tśi̯u ~ *ti̯u (Karlgren) ~ *tjo(ZS), mod. zhū "pearl".) Pritsak also argues that Mundus's father, Giesmus, had a name derived ultimately from the Turkic–Mongolian root kes/käs ("protector, bestower of favor, blessing, good-fortune").

Otto Maenchen-Helfen, however, takes Giesmus for a Germanic name and in this connection notes Moritz Schönfeld's Germanic etymology of Mundus, comparing it to the Germanic names Mundila and Munderic, both derived from PGmc *munda ("protection"). Stefan Krautschik likewise argues that the Germanic name of Mundus's grandson Theudimund speaks for a Germanic etymology. Gottfried Schramm rejects a Germanic origin, arguing that an original East Germanic name would have appeared as *Munda in Jordanes. However, Gudmund Schütte notes other East Germanic names recorded as ending in -o rather than -a, such as Veduco and Tremo, and proposed interference in the Latin transcription from another Germanic dialect.

== Ethnic identity ==
Different ancient authors give different indications of Mundus's ethnic identity. Jordanes identifies Mundus as "formerly of the Attilani," that is, the Huns (Jord. Get. 301), whereas John Malalas (chap. 450) and Theophanes the Confessor (A.M. 6032) identify Mundus as the son of a king of the Gepids. Marcellinus Comes refers to Mundus as a Geta, which he also uses to mean Ostrogoth, while Procopius merely says he was a barbarian.

The Prosopography of the Later Roman Empire has argued that because Mundo (Jordanes) has Hunnic origins and Mundus has Gepid origins, they cannot be the same person, an argument rejected by Patrick Amory and Stefan Krautschik. Brian Croke argued that Jordanes's statement could also mean that Mundus originated in the confederacy of the Huns rather than that he was a Hun himself. Stefan Krautschik instead argues that the Gepid royal family and the Attilid dynasty were likely connected by marriage. According to Amory, Mundus could have had ancestors who thought of themselves as Goths, Gepids, or Huns, from among which he and others could have chosen as needed.

== Biography ==
According to Theophanes, Mundus was the son of Giesmus, a ruler of the East Germanic tribe Gepids with his capital in Sirmium, and nephew to another Gepid ruler, Thraustila. After his father's death, Mundus was raised by his maternal uncle Thraustila, who likely succeeded Giesmus. Thraustila was killed in battle in 488, failing to resist the Ostrogoths and their king, Theodoric the Great. Sirmium was taken by the Ostrogoths. After Thraustila was succeeded by his son Traseric, Mundus came to lead a group of bandits in Pannonia. He declared himself a king and established himself in a tower called Herta. When the Byzantines sent an army to fight him under the general Sabinianus in 505, Theodoric sent his general Pitzias and he and Mundus joined forces and defeated Sabinianus. Although he disappears from the sources, Mundus appears to have remained Theodoric's ally until the latter's death in 526.

Mundus is next mentioned as a commander of the Gepids and Heruli in Pannonia in the 520s. In 529, in the context of new battles between the Gepids and Byzantines, Mundus and his son Mauricius entered Byzantine service and was made magister militum in Illyricum by the Byzantine emperor Justinian I, where he fought against the Slavs and Bulgars. In 531, he replaced Belisarius as magister militum per Orientem before re-assuming his rank of Magister militum per Illyricum again in 532. In that same year, Mundus and a troop of Heruli happened to be in Constantinople when the Nika riots broke out; he successfully suppressed the riots with Belisarius, with his troops massacring many near the hippodrome. In 535, with the outbreak of the Gothic War, Mundus was sent to Dalmatia and captured Salona (Split) from the Goths. In 536, his son Mauricius was killed during a Gothic counterattack; Mundus subsequently thoroughly defeated the Goths, but was killed while pursuing them.

== Bibliography ==
=== Primary sources ===
- Procopius, De Bello Persico, Volume I., De Bello Gothico, Volume I. (Project Gutenberg)
- John Malalas, Chronographia
- Theophanes the Confessor, Chronicle
- Marcellinus Comes, Chronicon

=== Secondary sources ===
- Amory, Patrick (1997). People and Identity in Ostrogotic Italy, 489-554. Cambridge Studies in Medieval Life and Thought. Cambridge University Press. ISBN 0-521-57151-0.
- Croke, Brian (1982). "Mundo the Gepid: From Freebooter to Roman General". Chiron. 12: 125–136.
- Doerfer, Gerhard (1973). "Zur Sprache der Hunnen". Central Asiatic Journal. 17 (1): 1–50. JSTOR 41927011.
- Förstemann, Ernst (1900). Altdeutsches Namenbuch, Band 1: Personennamen (2 ed.). Bonn.
- Karlgren, Bernhard (1957). "Grammata Serica Recensa". Bulletin of the Museum of Far Eastern Antiquities (29). Stockholm: 1–332.
- Krautschik, Stefan (1989). "Die Familie der Könige in Spätantike und Frühmittelalter" (PDF). In Chrsysos, Evangelos K.; Scharcz, Andreas (eds.). Das Reich und die Barbaren. Böhlau.
- Krautschik, Stefan (2010) [2002]. "Mundo". Reallexikon der germanischen Altertumskunde. de Gruyter.
- Maenchen-Helfen, Otto J. (1973). The World of the Huns: Studies in Their History and Culture. University of California Press. ISBN 9780520015968.
- Pritsak, Omeljan (1982). "The Hunnic Language of the Attila Clan". Harvard Ukrainian Studies. 4 (4): 428–476. ISSN 0363-5570. JSTOR 41036005.
- Schönfeld, Moritz (1911). Wörterbuch der altgermanischen Personen- und Völkernamen. Carl Winter's Universitätsverlag.
- Schramm, Gottfried (2013). "Aufsätze über einzelne Personennamen". Zweigliedrige Personennamen der Germanen Ein Bildetyp als gebrochener Widerschein früher Heldenlieder. de Gruyter. pp. 169–260.
- Schütte, Gudmund (1933). "Spätgotische Schlussvokale". Zeitschrift für deutsches Altertum und deutsche Literatur. 70 (1/2): 121–124. JSTOR 20653402.
- Tinnefeld, Franz (2006). "Mundo". Brill's New Pauly Online. Translated by Gentry, Francis G. Brill. doi:10.1163/1574-9347_bnp_e811820.
- Wozniak, Frank (1979). "Byzantine Diplomacy and the Lombard-Gepidic Wars". Balkan Studies. 20 (1): 139–158 – via OJS / PKP.
