= Moritz Schönfeld =

Dutch linguist

- Born: 9 February 1880; Groningen, Netherlands
- Died: 4 October 1958 (aged 78); Hilversum, Netherlands

Academic background
- Education: University of Groningen

Academic work
- Discipline: Germanic linguistics
- Institutions: Royal Netherlands Academy of Arts and Sciences
- Main interests: Germanic names; Germanic ethnonyms; Dutch etymology

Moritz Schönfeld (9 February 1880 – 4 October 1958) was a Dutch linguist who specialized in Germanic linguistics. Moritz Schönfeld was the author of several reference works on Germanic names and Dutch etymology which have been highly influential and are still in use today.

== Biography ==
Moritz Schönfeld was born in Groningen, Netherlands on 9 February 1880. His father taught mathematics and physics at the municipal gymnasium in Groningen.

Schönfeld began his studies at the University of Groningen in 1898, where he gained a PhD on Dutch literature in 1904. Schönfeld taught Dutch and geography in Meppel from 1905 to 1908, in Tilburg from 1908 to 1913, and at the municipal gymnasium in Hilversum until his retirement in 1945. At Hilversum, Schönfeld was the acting deputy principal for many years. Combined with his teaching duties, Schönfeld was a prominent scholar and editor. He was elected a member of the Royal Netherlands Academy of Arts and Sciences in 1930.

== Research ==
Schönfeld specialized in the study of Germanic personal names, and ethnonyms. His 1906 doctoral thesis on this subject was published in German with the title Wörterbuch der altgermanischen Personen- und Völkernamen nach der Überlieferung des Klassischen Altertums bearbeitet (1911). It has remained the standard reference work on the subject up to the present day. From 1917 to 1930, Schönfeld was contributed to a number of articles in the Realencyclopädie der classischen Altertumswissenschaft, published by Georg Wissowa. In 1921, Schönfeld published the first edition of his Historiese grammatika van het Nederlands. Schets van de klank- en vormleer. It has since been published in more than eight revised editions, and remains the standard reference work on Dutch grammar. Towards the end of his life, Schönfeld published Veldnamen in Nederland (1949) and Nederlandse waternamen (1955), both are important reference works on Dutch etymology. Schönfeld contributed a large number of articles to the Nomina geographica neerlandica, of which he served as an editor for many years.

== Selected works ==
- Wörterbuch der altgermanischen Personen- und Völkernamen nach der Überlieferung des klassischen Altertums, 1911
- Historische grammatica van het Nederlands (1921)
- Veldnamen in Nederland, 1949
- Nederlandse waternamen, (1955)

== See also ==
- Jan de Vries (philologist)

== Sources ==
- van Bree, Cor (14 November 2003). "Schönfeld, M." Digital Library for Dutch Literature (in Dutch).
