= Gothic War (535–554) =

Byzantine–Gothic war in Italy

- Part of the renovatio imperii
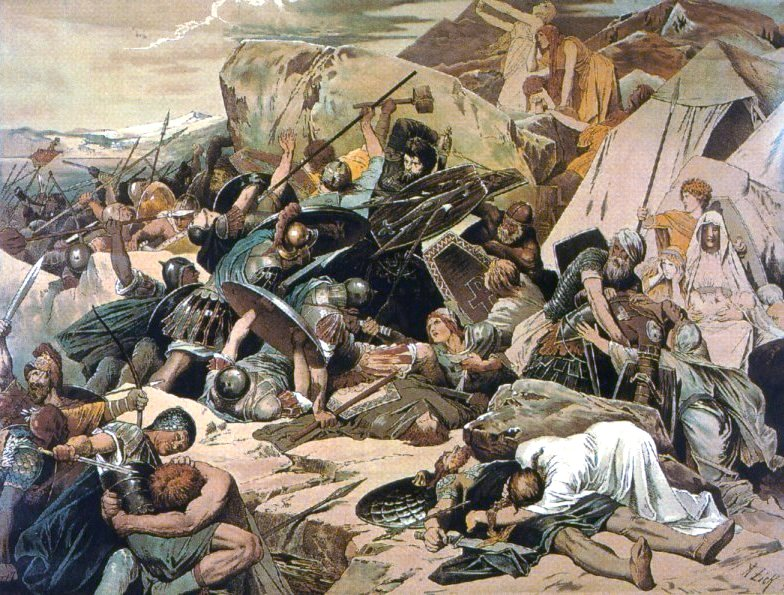
- A struggle between Goths and Byzantines, depicted by Alexander Zick, 1890
Date	535–554
Location	Italian Peninsula, Sicily, and Dalmatia
Result	Byzantine victory
Territorial changes	Byzantine Empire conquered the Ostrogothic Kingdom

Belligerents
Byzantine Empire; Franks (Note: The Franks were formally allied with the Byzantines. However, they secretly formed an alliance with the Goths with aim of letting both the Goths and the Byzantines to weaken by fighting each other. The Franks betrayed both sides once they found an opportunity.)	Ostrogothic Kingdom; Franks

Commanders and leaders
Justinian; Belisarius; Mundus †; Constantinianus; John; Narses	Theodahad X; Vitiges (POW); Ildibad X; Eraric X; Totila †; Teia †; Uraias X

The Gothic War between the Byzantine Empire during the reign of Emperor Justinian I and the Ostrogoths (Goths) took place from 535 to 554 in the Italian Peninsula, Dalmatia, Sardinia, Sicily, and Corsica. It was the last of the Gothic wars against the Byzantine Empire. The war had its roots in Justinian's ambition to recover the provinces of the former Western Roman Empire, which had been lost to invading barbarian tribes during the Migration Period.

The war followed the Byzantine reconquest of the diocese of Africa from the Vandals. Historians commonly divide the Gothic War into two phases. The first phase starts in 535 with the reconquest of Italy by the Byzantines with Belisarius as the commander-in-chief and ends in 540 with the fall of Ravenna, the capital of the Ostrogothic Kingdom. The second phase, which lasted from 540/541 to 554, featured a Gothic revival under Totila that was suppressed only after a long struggle by the Byzantine general Narses. The Byzantines also had to repel an invasion in 554 by the Franks, who were initially allies of the Byzantines but were also in secret with the Goths.

In 554, Justinian promulgated a pragmatic sanction that prescribed Italy's new government. Several cities in northern Italy held out against Constantinople until 562. By the end of the war, Italy had been devastated and depopulated. It was seen as a pyrrhic victory for the Byzantines, who were unable to resist an invasion by the Lombards in 568, resulting in Constantinople permanently losing control of large parts of the Italian peninsula.

== Background ==
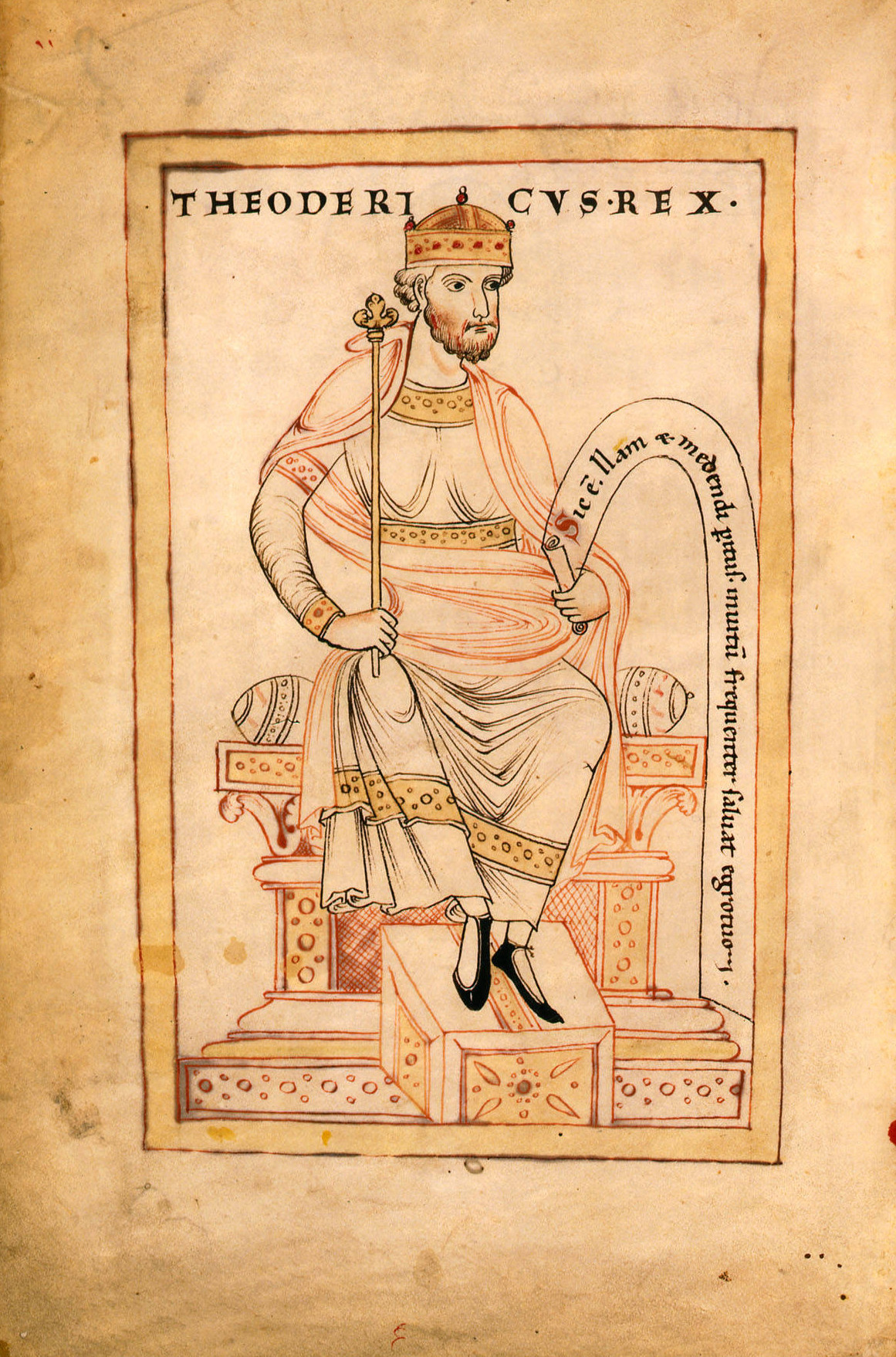
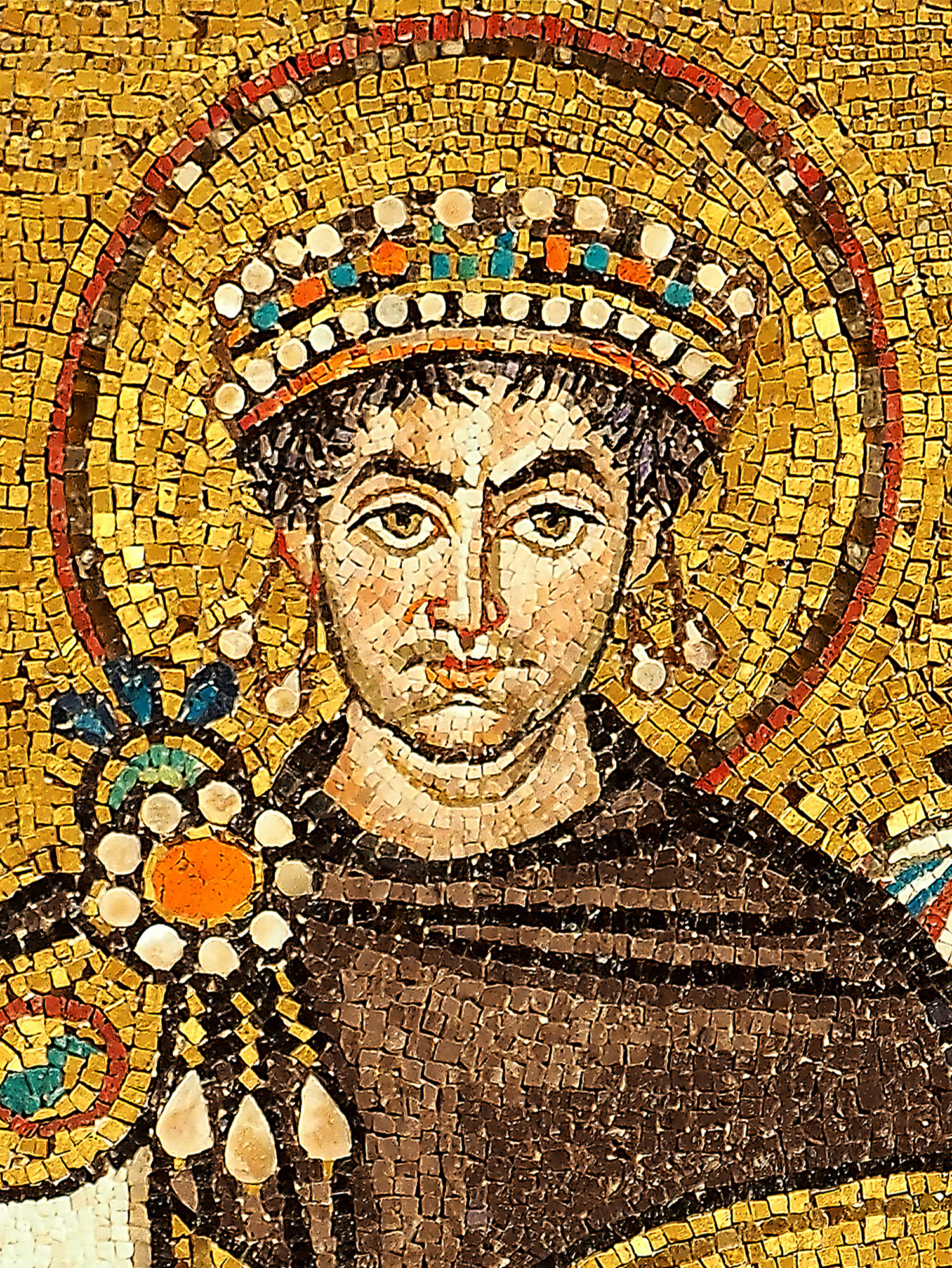
(Left) Theodoric the Great, king of the Ostrogoths, from a 12th-century German manuscript at Leiden University Library, Ms. vul. 46, dated 1176–1177. (Right) Sixth-century mosaic depicting Justinian, from the Basilica of San Vitale, Ravenna, Italy

In 476, Odoacer deposed Emperor Romulus Augustulus and declared himself their king (rex), resulting in the fall of the Western Roman Empire. Although Odoacer recognized the nominal suzerainty of the Byzantine emperor, Zeno, his independent policies and increasing strength made him a threat in the eyes of Constantinople. To provide a buffer, the Ostrogoths (Goths) of Theodoric the Great were settled as foederati (foreign allies) of the empire in the western Balkans but unrest continued. Zeno sent the Goths to Italy as the representatives of the empire to remove Odoacer. Theodoric and the Goths defeated Odoacer and Italy came under Gothic rule. In the arrangement between Theodoric and Zeno and his successor Anastasius, the land and its people were regarded as part of the Empire, with Theodoric a viceroy and head of the army (magister militum).

This arrangement was scrupulously observed by Theodoric; there was continuity in civil administration of Italy, which was staffed exclusively by Romans, and legislation remained the preserve of the emperor. The army was exclusively Gothic, under the authority of their chiefs and courts. The peoples were also divided by religion: the Italo-Romans were Chalcedonian Christians, while the Goths were Arian Christians. Unlike the Vandals or the early Visigoths, the Goths practiced considerable religious tolerance. The dual system worked under the capable leadership of Theodoric, who conciliated the Italian aristocracy, but the system began to break down during his later years and collapsed under his heirs.

With the ascension of Emperor Justin I, the end of the Acacian schism between the Eastern and Western churches, and the return of ecclesiastical unity within the East, several members of the Italian senatorial aristocracy began to favor closer ties to Constantinople to balance Gothic power. The deposition and execution of the distinguished magister officiorum Boethius and his father-in-law in 524 were part of the slow estrangement from the Gothic regime. Theodoric was succeeded by his 10-year-old grandson Athalaric in August 526, with his mother, Amalasuntha, as regent; she had been educated in the Roman tradition and she began a rapprochement with the Senate and the Empire. This conciliation and Athalaric's Roman education displeased Gothic magnates, who plotted against her. Amalasuntha had three of the leading conspirators killed and wrote to Justinian, asking for sanctuary if she was deposed. Amalasuntha remained in Italy.

== Prelude ==
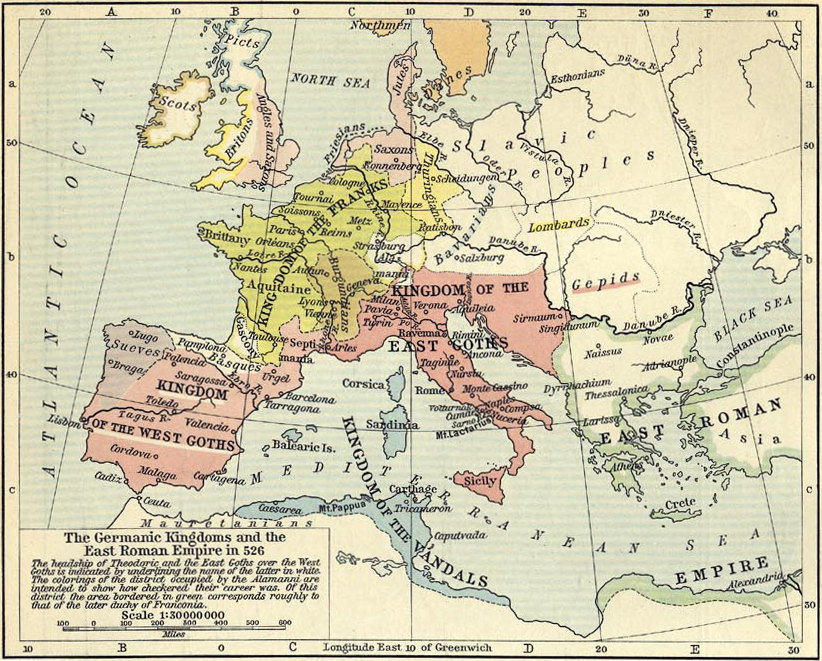
Map of the Byzantine (East Roman) Empire and the Germanic kingdoms of the western Mediterranean in 526

In 533, using a dynastic dispute as a pretext, Justinian sent his most talented general, Belisarius, to recover the North African provinces held by the Vandals. The Vandalic War produced an unexpectedly swift and decisive victory for the Byzantine Empire and encouraged Justinian in his ambition to recover the rest of the lost western provinces. As regent, Amalasuntha had allowed the Byzantine fleet to use the harbors of Sicily. After the death of Athalaric in 534, Amalasuntha offered the kingship to her cousin Theodahad, who accepted the offer but then had her arrested; she was killed in early 535. Justinian tried, through his agents, to save Amalasuntha's life, and eventually her death became a casus belli against the Goths. Procopius wrote that "upon learning what had befallen Amalasuntha, immediately entered upon the war, being in the ninth year of his reign".

Belisarius was appointed commander in chief (strategos autokrator) for the expedition against the Goths with 7,500 men. Mundus, the magister militum per Illyricum, was ordered to occupy the Gothic province of Dalmatia. The forces made available to Belisarius were small, especially when compared with the larger army he had fielded against the Vandals, an enemy weaker than the Goths. The preparations for the operation were carried out in secret. Justinian secured the neutrality of the Franks with gifts of gold and adopted the Frankish king Theudebert I as his son.

== First Byzantine campaign, 535–540 ==
=== Conquest of Sicily and Dalmatia ===
Operations during the first five years of the war, featuring the conquest of Italy directed by Belisarius

Belisarius landed in Sicily, between Byzantine Africa and Italy, whose populace was well disposed toward the Empire. The island was quickly brought under Byzantine control, with only Palermo resisting before falling in late December. Belisarius prepared to cross to Italy, and Theodahad sent envoys to Justinian, proposing at first to cede Sicily and recognize his overlordship, but later to cede all of Italy.

In March 536, Mundus overran Dalmatia and captured its capital, Salona, but a large Gothic army arrived. Mundus's son Mauricius died in a skirmish. Mundus defeated the Goths but he was mortally wounded in the pursuit. The Byzantine army withdrew, and Dalmatia was abandoned to the Goths except for Salona. Encouraged by these developments, Theodahad imprisoned the Byzantine ambassadors. Justinian sent a new magister militum per Illyricum, Constantinianus, to recover Dalmatia and ordered Belisarius to cross into Italy. Constantinianus accomplished his task speedily. The Gothic general, Gripas, abandoned Salona, which he had only recently occupied, because of the ruined state of its fortifications and the pro-Byzantine sympathies of its citizens, withdrawing to the north. Constantinianus occupied the city and rebuilt the walls. Seven days later, the Gothic army departed for Italy, and by late June, the whole of Dalmatia was in Byzantine hands.

=== Naples and first siege of Rome ===
In 536, Belisarius crossed into Italy, where he captured Rhegium and made his way north. Naples was besieged for approximately three weeks before imperial troops breached the city's defenses in November. Byzantine forces, some of barbarian origin, then sacked Naples. Belisarius quickly restored order, let his troops keep the looted goods, and freed all the prisoners.

The speed of the Byzantine advance took the Goths by surprise, and the inactivity of Theodahad enraged them. After the fall of Naples, he was deposed and replaced by Vitiges. The new Gothic King installed a 4,000-strong garrison in Rome and then left for Ravenna, where he married Amalasuntha's daughter Matasuntha by force to strengthen his claim to the throne. He also began rallying his forces against the invasion. Vitiges then proceeded to negotiate with the Franks, who were in alliance with the Byzantines. Theodahad had proposed handing over the Gothic territory in Gaul, along with 2,000 pounds of gold, in return for their agreement to assist him in the war. Theodahad died before the transaction was concluded and Vitiges sought to complete this arrangement. The Frankish kings agreed, but they were unwilling to openly break their alliance with the Emperor Justinian. Instead, they secretly promised to send warriors drawn from their tributary peoples to maintain plausible deniability. In the meantime, Belisarius moved north to Rome. The citizens of Rome, in view of the fate of Naples, put up no resistance. The Gothic garrison, recognizing the difficulty of defending a city whose population was openly hostile to Gothic rule, chose to withdraw. Belisarius entered unopposed on 9 December 536.

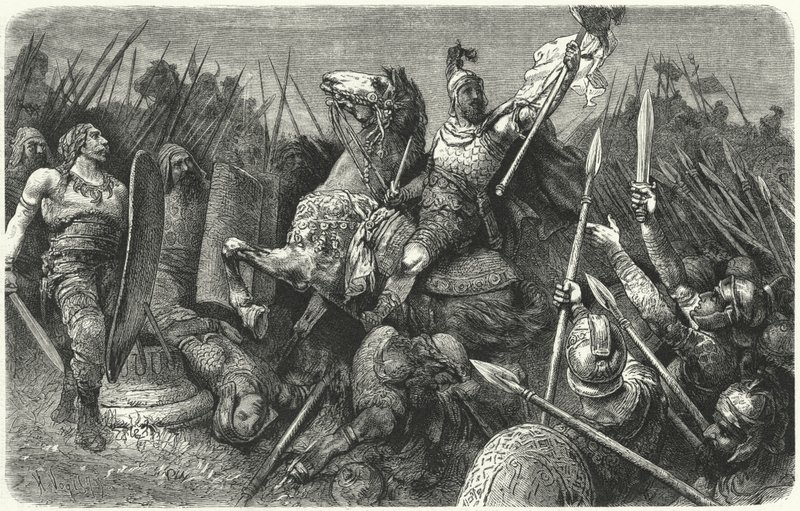
Belisarius attacking the Ostrogoths in Rome, 536, by Hermann Vogel

The Byzantine capture of Rome placed the Goths in a difficult position. Although the city held limited strategic value, its political and symbolic significance was immense. The Goths were forced to surrender initiative and retake the city immediately. According to Procopius, Vitiges led a 150,000-strong force against Rome, where Belisarius, who did not have enough troops to face the Goths in the open field, remained. The subsequent siege of Rome, the first of the major three in the Gothic War, lasted from March 537 to March 538. Belisarius was able to utilize Rome's fortifications with the use of artillery and local conscripts to balance the odds. After the arrival of 1,600 Byzantine Hunnic and Slavic mounted archers from Constantinople in April 537, Belisarius started the offensive with hit-and-run tactics, inflicting considerable casualties upon the Goths, who were unable to counter them. The imperial navy cut off the Goths from seaborne supplies, worsening their difficulties. An armistice was agreed for both sides by the end of 537, however, the arrival of another 5,000 reinforcements prompted the Byzantines to capture several towns near Rome from the Goths. Belisarius also dispatched John the Sanguinary with 2,000 cavalry to the Picenum region, ordering him to avoid open conflict until the armistice was broken. Following three Gothic attempts to breach Rome, Belisarius ordered John to commence raids. John instead captured Ariminum (modern-day Rimini), a strategically important city near Ravenna. The close proximity to the Gothic capital forced Vitiges to abandon the siege and withdraw.

=== Siege of Ariminum ===
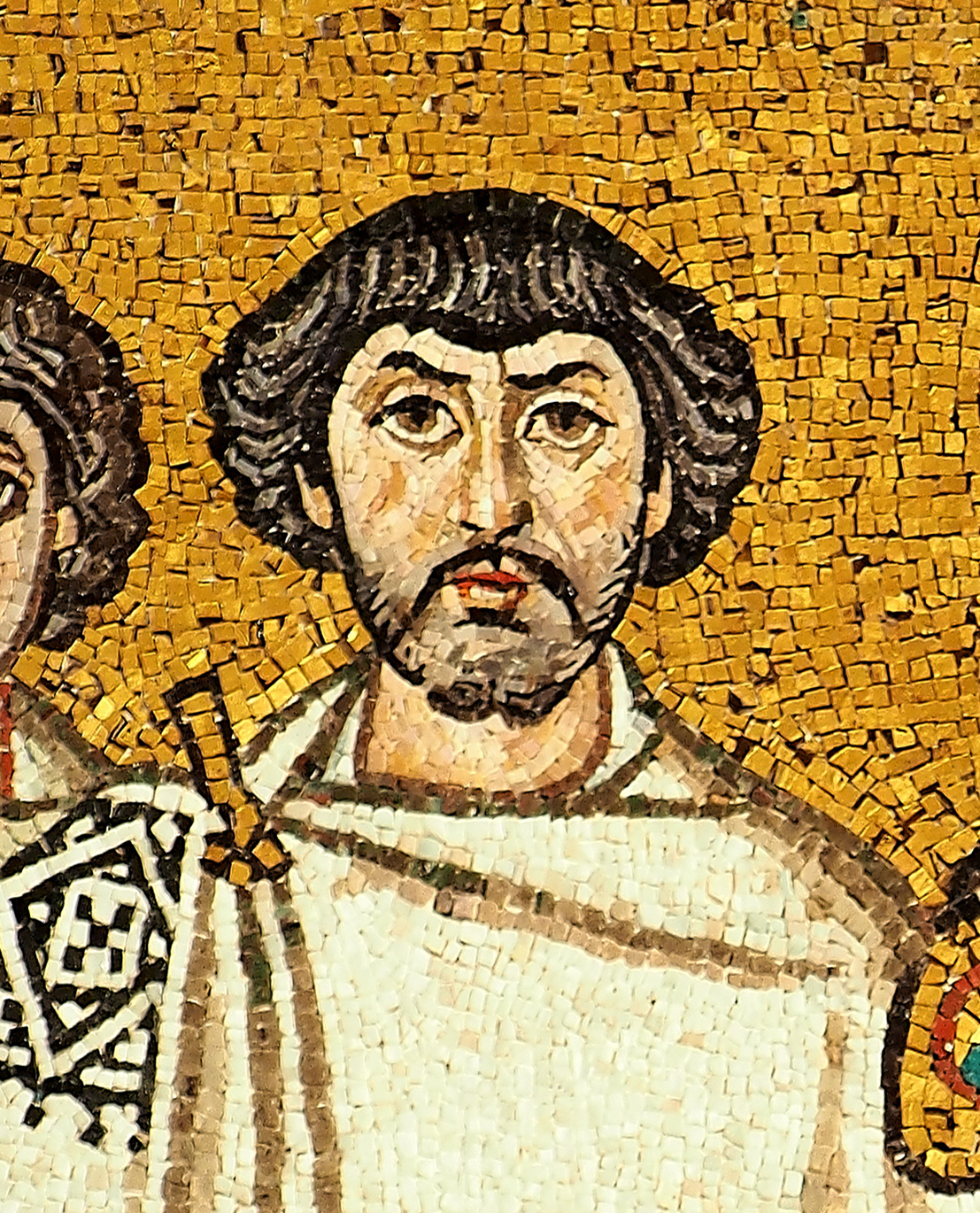
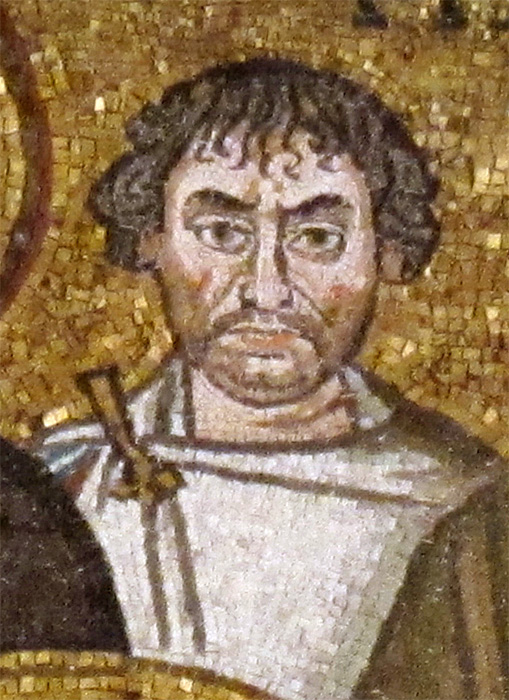
Mosaics, 6th century, depicting Belisarius (left) and Narses (right), from the Basilica of San Vitale, Ravenna, Italy

As Vitiges marched to the northeast, he strengthened the garrisons of towns and forts along the way to secure his rear and then turned towards Ariminum. The Byzantine force of 2,000 horsemen occupying it comprised some of Belisarius's finest cavalry; Belisarius decided to replace them with an infantry garrison. Their commander, John, refused to obey Belisarius and remained at Ariminum. Shortly after the Goths arrived, an assault failed, but the city had few supplies with which to stand a siege. Reinforcement of 5,000 Byzantine troops under the Chamberlain Narses arrived at Picenum and a force of 2,000 Herul foederati joined Belisarius just before Narses arrived. Belisarius and Narses met at Firmum, where they convened a council of officers to decide whether the army should march to John's aid in Ariminum. Most of the officers opposed helping John, resentful of his challenge to Belisarius's authority. Narses appealed to Belisarius and his officers to carry out the rescue, as a Gothic victory could boost their morale. The arrival of a letter from John, which illustrated the immediate danger of the city's fall, resolved the issue in favor of Narses. Belisarius divided his army into a seaborne force under lieutenant Ildiger, another under the equally experienced Martin, which was to arrive from the south and the main force under him and Narses, which was to arrive from the northwest. Vitiges learned of their approach and, faced with the prospect of being surrounded by superior forces, he retreated to Ravenna.

Despite the bloodless victory by Belisarius at Ariminum, John declined to express any gratitude to Belisarius and instead claimed that Narses deserved the credit because it was Narses who had compelled Belisarius to come to his rescue. Belisarius recognized the growing tensions with Narses, fuelled by his aides and convened a meeting with the army officers. At the meeting, he cautioned the officers against overconfidence, noting that the Goths still held numerical superiority and had only been defeated through the united Byzantine leadership. Belisarius outlined the surrounding Gothic forces and proposed dividing the army to relieve Milan while besieging Auximus, a strategic stronghold for the capture of Ravenna. Narses opposed this plan, arguing instead for securing Via Aemilia and pressuring Ravenna. Historian Ilkka Syvänne argues that Narses's strategy overlooked Gothic logistical weaknesses and effectively abandoned Milan, noting that eventually Belisarius proved correct. Upon hearing Narses's argument, Belisarius revealed to him the emperor's letter stating that he had supreme authority.

We have not sent our steward Narses to Italy to command the army; for we wish Belisarius alone to command the whole army in whatever manner seems to him to be best, and it is the duty of all of you to follow him in the interest of our state.

Narses responded that Belisarius's proposals were not "in the interests of the state" and thus he could not follow them. Belisarius did not allow matters to fester and marched with Narses and John against Urbinus. The two armies encamped separately, and shortly afterward, Narses, convinced that the town was unassailable and well supplied, broke camp and departed for Ariminum. From there, he sent John to Aemilia, which was quickly subdued. Aided by the fortunate drying up of Urbinus's only water spring, the town fell to Belisarius soon after.

=== Fall of Mediolanum ===
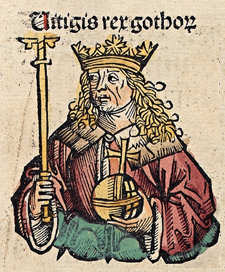
Witigis in the Nuremberg Chronicle, 1493

In April 538, Belisarius, petitioned by representatives from Mediolanum (modern-day Milan), the second most populous and wealthy city in Italy after Rome, sent a force of 1,000 men under Mundilas to the city. This force secured the city and most of Liguria, except Ticinum (Pavia), with ease. Vitiges called upon the Franks for help and a force of 10,000 Burgundians crossed the Alps. Combining with the Goths under his nephew Uraias, they laid siege to the city. Mediolanum was ill-provisioned and under-garrisoned; the small Byzantine force had been dispersed to garrison the neighboring cities and forts. A relief force was dispatched by Belisarius, but its commanders, Martin and Uliaris, did not make any effort to help the besieged city. Instead, they asked for further reinforcements from John and the magister militum per Illyricum Justin, which were operating in the nearby province of Aemilia.

Dissension among the Byzantine commanders exacerbated the situation, as John and Justin refused to move without orders from Narses. Belisarius pleaded with Narses, who agreed. As John made preparations to cross the River Po to reach Mediolanum, he fell ill, halting the relief. The delays proved fatal for the city, which, after many months of siege, was close to starvation. The Goths offered Mundilas a guarantee that the lives of his soldiers would be spared if he surrendered the city, but no guarantee was offered for the civilians, and he refused. By the end of March 539, his starving soldiers forced him to accept the terms. The Byzantine garrison was spared, but the inhabitants were subjected to massacre, and the city was razed. (Note: Procopius gives the number of adult males slain as 300,000, but this is improbably high. The women were sold to the Burgundians for their support in the siege and the city was destroyed.)

=== Frankish invasion ===
After this disaster, Narses was recalled to Constantinople, leaving Belisarius as the supreme commander with authority of the Byzantine forces in Italy. Vitiges sent envoys to the Persian court, hoping to persuade Khosrow I to reopen hostilities with the Byzantines to force Justinian to concentrate the majority of his forces, including Belisarius, in the east and allow the Goths to recover. Belisarius resolved to conclude the war by taking Ravenna, but had to deal with the Gothic strongholds of Auximus (modern-day Osimo) and Fiesole first. While Martin and John hindered the Gothic army under Uraias, which was attempting to cross the River Po, a part of the army under Justin besieged Fiesole and Belisarius undertook the Siege of Auximus. During the sieges, a 100,000-strong Frankish army under King Theudebert crossed the Alps and came upon the Goths and the Byzantines encamped on the two banks of the Po. They attacked the Goths, who, thinking they had come as allies, were swiftly routed. The equally astonished Byzantines also gave battle, were defeated and withdrew southwards into Tuscany. The Frankish invasion was defeated by an outbreak of dysentery, which caused the loss of a third of the army forcing the Franks to withdraw. Belisarius concentrated on the besieged cities, and both garrisons were forced by starvation to capitulate in October or November 539.

=== Capture of Ravenna ===
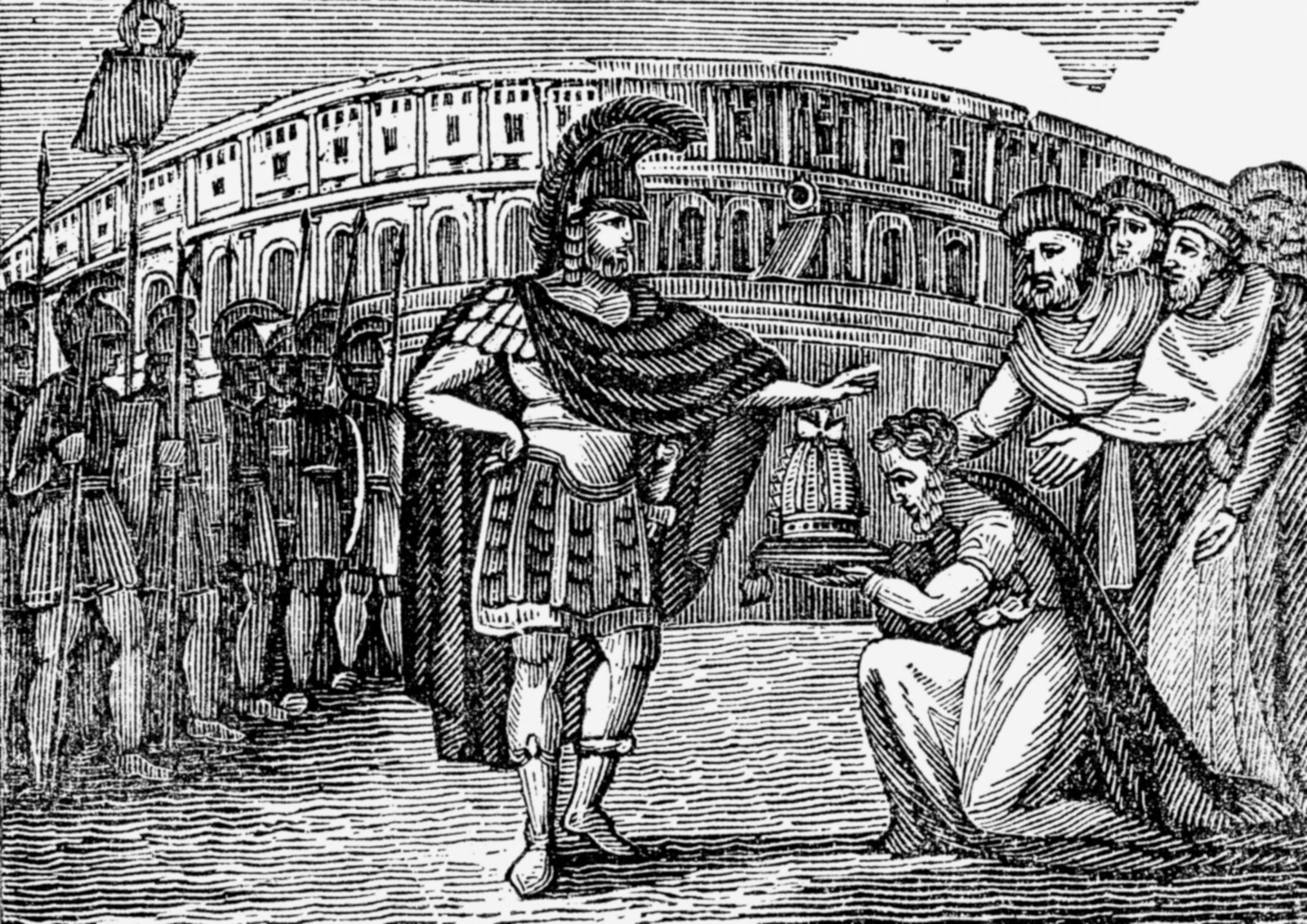
Belisarius refusing the crown of Italy offered by the Goths in 540

Troops from Dalmatia reinforced Belisarius, and he moved against Ravenna. Detachments moved north of the Po, and the imperial fleet patrolled the Adriatic Sea, cutting the city off from supplies. Inside the Gothic capital, Vitiges received a Frankish embassy looking for an alliance, but after the events of the previous summer, no trust was placed in the Frankish offers. Soon afterward, an embassy came from Constantinople, bearing surprisingly lenient terms from Justinian. Anxious to finish the war and concentrate against the impending Persian war, the Emperor offered a partition of Italy; the lands south of the Po would be retained by Constantinople, those north of the river by the Goths. Goths readily accepted the terms, but Belisarius refused to sign even though his generals disagreed with him.

Disheartened, the Goths offered to make Belisarius, whom they respected, the emperor of the Western Roman Empire. Belisarius had no intention of accepting the role but saw how he could use this situation to his advantage and feigned acceptance. In May 540, Belisarius and his army entered Ravenna; the city was not looted, while the Goths were well treated and allowed to keep their properties. In the aftermath of Ravenna's surrender, several Gothic garrisons north of the Po surrendered. Others remained in Gothic hands, among which were Ticinum, where Uraias was based, and Verona, held by Ildibad. Soon after, Belisarius sailed for Constantinople, where he was refused the honor of a triumph. Vitiges was named a patrician, while the captive Goths were sent to reinforce the eastern armies.

== Gothic revival and dissolution, 541–554 ==
=== Reigns of Ildibad and Eraric ===
If Belisarius had not been recalled, he would probably have completed the conquest of the peninsula within a few months. This, which would have been the best solution, was defeated by the jealousy of Justinian; and the peace proposed by the Emperor, which was the next best course, was defeated by the disobedience of his generals. Between them, they bear the responsibility of inflicting upon Italy twelve more years of war.

— J. B. Bury, History of the Later Roman Empire (1958)

Belisarius' departure left most of Italy in Byzantine hands, but north of the Po, Pavia (which became the new capital of the Gothic Kingdom) and Verona remained unconquered. Soon after Belisarius' breach of faith towards them became apparent, the Goths, at the suggestion of Uraias, chose Ildibad as their new king, and he re-established Gothic control over Venetia and Liguria. Justinian failed to appoint an Italian commander-in-chief. As a result, the commanders neglected military discipline and committed acts of plunder. The new imperial bureaucracy made itself unpopular with its fiscal demands.

Ildibad defeated the Byzantine general Vitalius at Treviso, but after having Uraias murdered over a quarrel between their wives, he was assassinated in May 541 in retribution. The Rugians, remnants of Odoacer's army who had remained in Italy and sided with the Goths, proclaimed one of their own, Eraric, as the new king, which was unexpectedly assented to by the Goths. Eraric persuaded the Goths to start negotiations with Justinian, secretly intending to hand over the realm to the empire. The Goths perceived his inactivity for what it was and turned to Ildibad's nephew, Totila (or Baduila), and offered to make him king. Totila had already opened negotiations with the Byzantines, but when he was contacted by the conspirators, he assented. In the early autumn of 541, Eraric was murdered, and Totila was proclaimed king.

=== Early Gothic successes ===
Main army movements during the second phase of the Gothic War

Totila enjoyed several advantages. The outbreak of the plague devastated and depopulated the Empire in 542. The start of the Lazic War against the Persians forced Justinian to deploy most of his troops in the east. Moreover, the incompetence and disunity of the various Byzantine generals in Italy undermined military function and discipline. This last brought about Totila's first success. After much urging by Justinian, the generals Constantinianus and Alexander combined their forces and advanced upon Verona. Through treachery, they managed to capture a gate in the city walls; instead of pressing the attack, they delayed to quarrel over the prospective booty, allowing the Goths to recapture the gate and force the Byzantines to withdraw. Totila attacked their camp near Faenza with 5,000 men and, at the Battle of Faventia, defeated the Byzantine army. Totila marched into Tuscany, where he besieged Florence. The Byzantine generals, John, Bessas, and Cyprian, marched to its relief, but at the Battle of Mucellium, their numerically superior forces were defeated.

=== Totila's capture of Italy ===
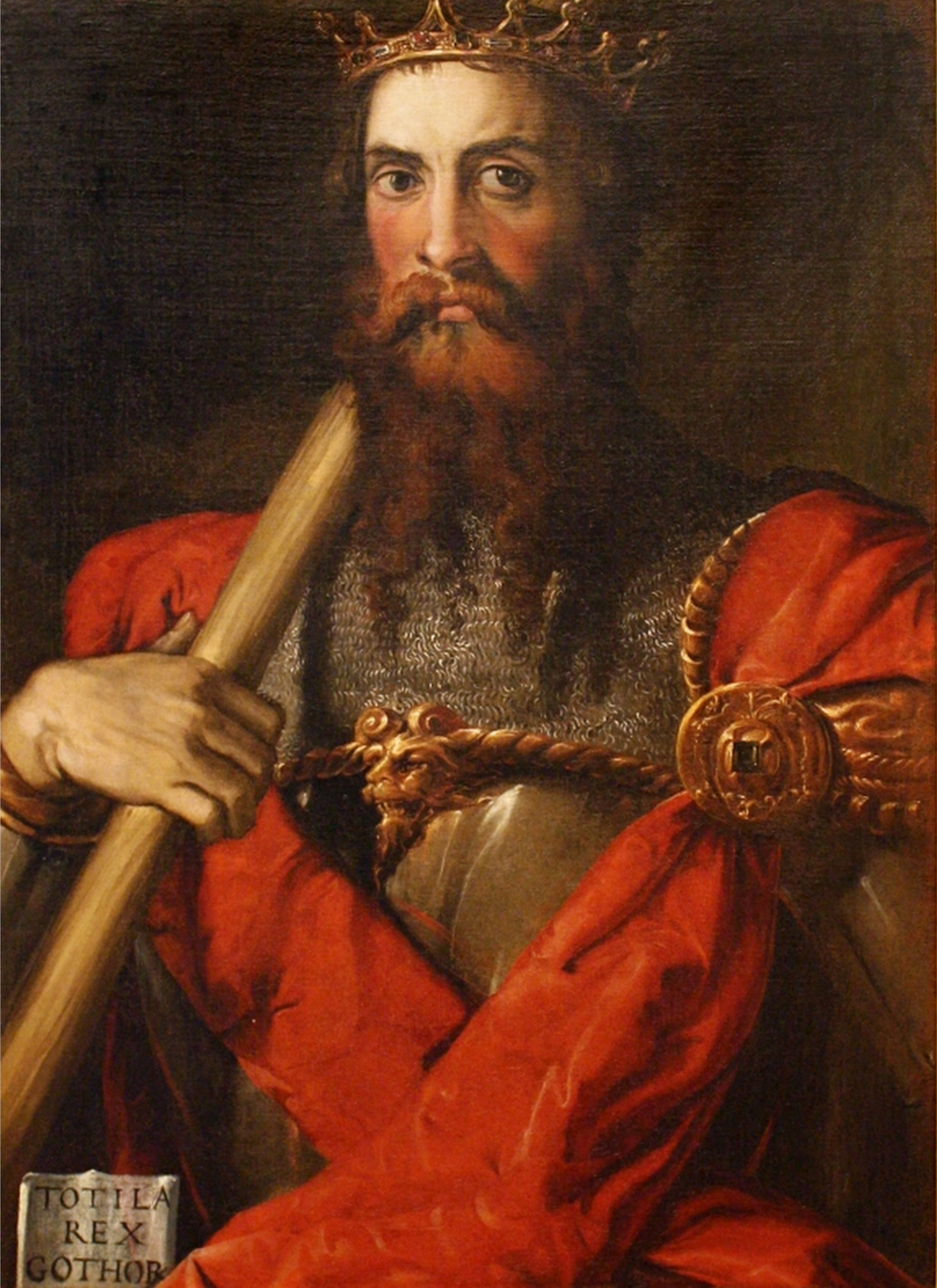
Totila by Francesco Salviati, c. 1549

Totila marched south, where Byzantine garrisons were few and weak, bypassing Rome and much of central Italy. The provinces of southern Italy were forced to recognize his authority. This campaign was one of rapid movement to take control of the countryside, leaving the Byzantines in control of a few isolated strongholds, mostly on the coast, which could be reduced later. When a fortified location fell, its walls were usually razed so that it would no longer be of any military value. Totila followed a policy of treating his captives well, enticing opponents to surrender rather than resist to the end. He also tried to win over the Italian population, exemplified by Totila's behavior during the Siege of Naples, where he allowed the city to surrender on terms in 543 and displayed, in the words of historian J. B. Bury, "considerable humanity" in his treatment of the defenders. He nursed the famished citizens back to strength after allowing the Byzantine garrison safe departure. Having captured Naples, Totila attempted to broker a peace with Justinian. When this was refused, he had copies of his appeal posted throughout Rome; despite the disfavor in which the Byzantines were held, there was no uprising in Totila's favor, which disgusted him. He marched north and besieged the city.

Taking advantage of a five-year truce in the East, Belisarius was sent back to Italy with 200 ships in 544. He reoccupied much of southern Italy, but he was short of supplies and reinforcements due to the manpower shortage caused by the ongoing plague and the jealousy of Justinian, leading to his inability to march to Rome's relief. Procopius describes famine during the siege, in which the ordinary citizens of Rome, who were not rich enough to buy grain from the military, were reduced to eating bran, nettles, dogs, mice and finally "each other's dung". Pope Vigilius, who had fled to the safety of Syracuse, sent a flotilla of grain ships, but Totila's navy intercepted them near the mouth of the Tiber and captured them.

Belisarius attempted to relieve Rome. According to Procopius, the plan involved sailing a force up the river Tiber, destroying the temporary bridge and watchtowers constructed by Totila's forces by dropping a boat filled with flammable materials onto a watchtower from a makeshift tower built on top of two fastened skiffs, which succeeded. Afterward, his subordinate Isaakes, ordered to remain in the city of Portus, heard of his early successes and took a cavalry force to attack the Gothic stockade, eager to share the glory. This resulted in his capture, and once the news of this reached Belisarius, he interpreted the news as Portus had been captured by the Goths, meaning he had lost the only allied settlement close by, and that his wife, present in the city, was now a hostage of the Goths. Said to have been struck with a bout of aphasia, he called for a retreat to immediately retake Portus, only to discover that it remained under Byzantine control. After more than a year, Totila finally entered Rome on 17 December 546, when his men scaled the walls at night and opened the Porta Asinaria. Totila was aided by some Isaurian troops from the imperial garrison who had arranged a secret pact with the Goths to open the gates. The Goths entered through the gate and Rome was plundered. Totila intended to level the whole city, but Belisarius pleaded with him in a letter to spare the city. Totila satisfied himself with tearing down about one-third of the walls. He then left in pursuit of the Byzantine forces in Apulia.

Belisarius successfully reoccupied Rome four months later in the spring of 547 and hastily rebuilt the demolished sections of wall by piling up the loose stones "one on top of the other, regardless of order". Totila returned, but was unable to overcome the defenders. However, Belisarius did not follow up his advantage. Several cities, including Perugia, were taken by the Goths, while Belisarius remained inactive and was then recalled from Italy. By late 547, Justinian was finally able to commit more resources to the campaign in Italy, and sent reinforcements gradually. In early 548, Belisarius received an additional 2000 infantry to bolster his forces, and Justinian ordered Valerian, the magister militum of Armeniam to join the Italian campaign. However, Belisarius was not satisfied with the size of the reinforcements, and sent his wife Antonina to Constantinople to request for more, before being recalled soon after.

In 549, Totila advanced again against Rome. He attempted to storm the improvised walls and overpower the small garrison of 3,000 men, but was beaten back. He then prepared to blockade the city and starve out the defenders, although the Byzantine commander Diogenes had previously prepared large food stores and had sown wheat fields within the city walls. However, Totila was able to suborn part of the garrison, who opened the Porta Ostiensis gate for him. Totila's men swept through the city, killing all but the women, who were spared on the orders of Totila, and looting what riches remained. Expecting the nobles and the remainder of the garrison to flee as soon as the walls were taken, Totila set traps along the roads to neighboring towns that were not yet under his control, and many were killed while fleeing Rome.

=== Byzantine reconquest, 550–553 ===
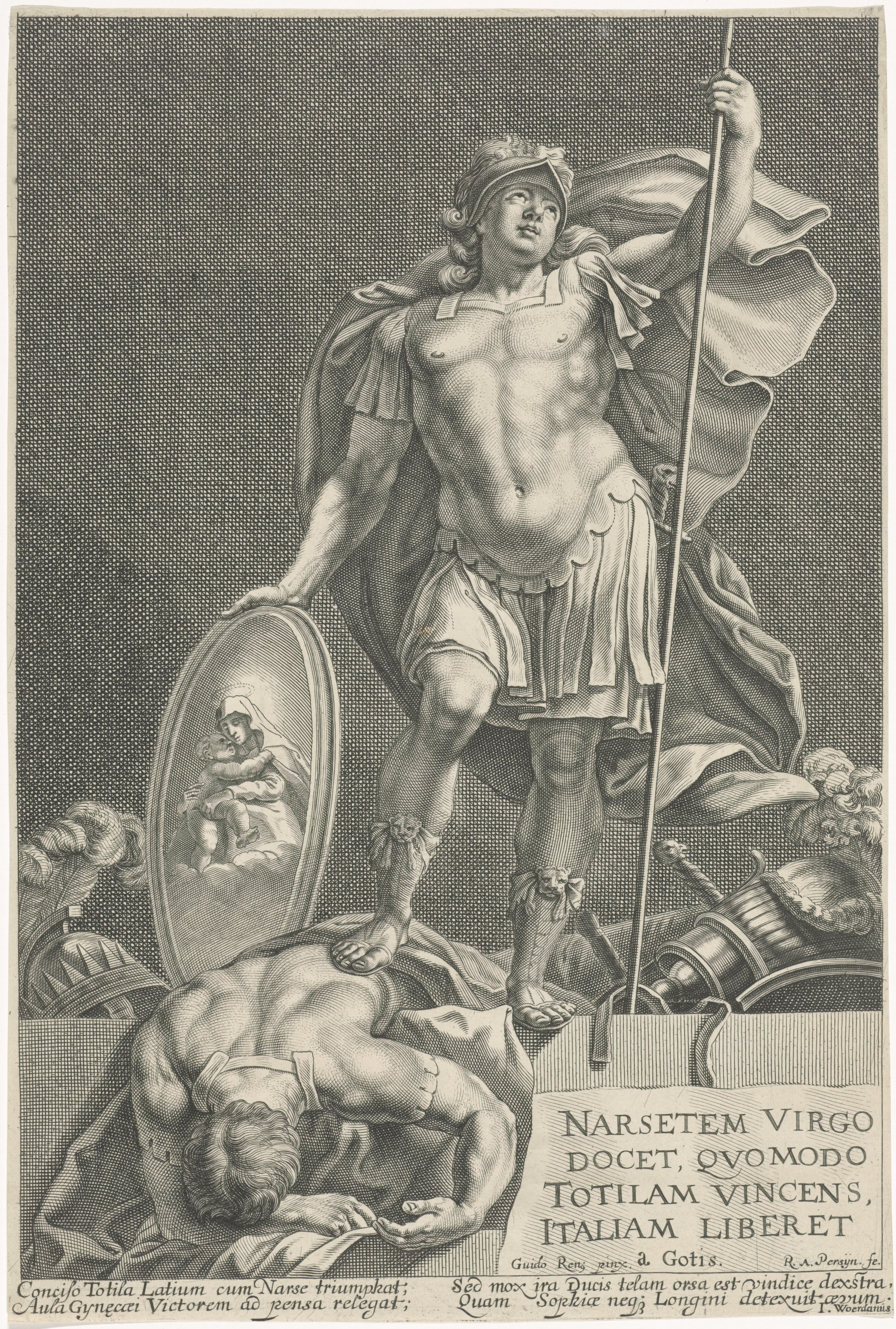
Byzantine general Narses over the defeated Totila (king of the Ostrogoths)

By 550, the Goths had regained control of much of the Italian Peninsula. Totila had also built a navy capable of challenging Byzantine control of the seas, with the aim of preventing the Byzantines from resupplying and reinforcing their strongholds in Italy. Through these efforts, Totila sought to gain sufficient leverage in negotiations with Justinian to secure the continued existence of a Gothic polity in Italy under imperial suzerainty.

In autumn 551, the Goths besieged Ancon by land and sea. Ancon was a port at a strategic location midway between Ravenna and Dryus (modern-day Otranto). Realizing the consequences of this loss, the Byzantine generals Valerian in Ravenna and John in Salona sent a relief fleet. The Gothic and Byzantine fleets were similar in size, encouraging the Goths to engage head-on near Sena Gallica. In the Battle of Sena Gallica (551), the more experienced Byzantine sailors maintained better formation and coordination, defeating the Goths at sea. The Goths abandoned the siege and ended their attempt to challenge the Byzantines at sea. The Byzantine victory signaled to the Goths that their position was weakening and they started to believe that they might be unable to withstand a future major Byzantine offensive. Totila sent ambassadors to Constantinople to negotiate peace, offering to relinquish Gothic claims to Sicily and Dalmatia and to pay the taxes owed on abandoned estates in those provinces. Justinian refused to consider the proposal.

During 550–551, the Byzantines assembled a sizable expeditionary force at Salona in the Dalmatia region. The army included regular Byzantine units and a significant contingent of foreign allies, notably Lombards, Heruls, and Bulgars. Narses, the imperial chamberlain (cubicularius), was appointed to command in mid-551. The following spring, Narses led this army around the coast of the Adriatic Sea to Ravenna. After nine days of rest, he continued to Ancon (modern-day Ancona) and then turned inland, intending to march down the via Flaminia to Rome while avoiding Gothic strongholds. Totila was in a difficult position. Either he had to divide his field army to garrison Rome and other fortified cities, or he had to intercept Narses's army before reaching Rome. Totila marched with his army to intercept Narses. Near the village of Taginae, the Byzantines encountered the Gothic army, commanded by Totila. Finding himself outnumbered, Totila ostensibly entered into negotiations while waiting for reinforcements and planning a surprise attack, but Narses, expecting a ruse, deployed his army in a strong defensive position. Reinforcements having arrived, Totila launched a sudden attack at the Battle of Taginae, with a mounted charge on the Byzantine centre. The attack failed and, by evening, the Goths had broken and fled; Totila was mortally wounded. The death of Totila marked the beginning of the end of the Gothic kingdom.

Narses marched and captured Rome with little resistance. The remaining Goths chose Teia as their new king. However, the Goths were forced to engage with Narses as he was besieging Cumae, the location of Totila's war chest. The two armies met near Naples, and at the Battle of Mons Lactarius in October 553, Narses defeated the Gothic army. Teia was mortally wounded, becoming the last king of the Goths.

=== Frankish invasion, 553–554 ===
Though the Goths were defeated, Narses soon had to face a Frankish army that invaded northern Italy and southern Gaul. In early 553, an army of about 75,000 Franks and Alemanni crossed the Alps and took the town of Parma. They defeated a force under the Heruli commander Fulcaris, and soon many Goths from northern Italy joined their forces. Narses had dispersed his troops to garrisons throughout central Italy and had wintered at Rome. After serious depredations throughout Italy, the barbarians were brought to battle by Narses on the banks of the river Volturnus. In the Battle of the Volturnus, the Byzantines held off a Frankish assault while the Byzantine cavalry encircled them. The Franks and Alemanni were all but annihilated. Seven thousand Goths held out at Campsa, near Naples, until capitulating in the spring of 555. The lands and cities across the River Po were still held by Franks, Alemanni, and Goths. It was not until 562 that their last strongholds, the cities of Verona and Brixia, were subjugated. According to Procopius, the barbarian population was then allowed to live peacefully in Italy under Byzantine sovereignty.

== Aftermath ==
Territorial expansion of the Byzantine Empire between 527 and 554

In Italy, the war devastated the urban society that was supported by a settled hinterland. Following his victory over the Goths, Narses initiated a period of reconstruction under Justinian's Pragmatic Sanction of 554, rebuilding ruined infrastructure, repairing aqueducts, and restructuring the administration to restore Imperial civil order. However, these efforts proved short-lived against the scale of physical, demographic, and economic ruin. Rome and Milan, two of the most populous cities, became shadows of their former selves just as other cities were abandoned. Italy fell into a long period of decline.

The impoverishment of Italy and the drain on the empire made it impossible for the Byzantines to hold their gains. Only three years after the death of Justinian in 565, the mainland Italian territories fell into the hands of the Lombards. The Exarchate of Ravenna, a band of territory that stretched across central Italy to the Tyrrhenian Sea and south to Naples, along with parts of southern Italy, was the only remaining imperial holding. Rome remained under imperial control until the Exarchate of Ravenna was conquered by the Lombards in 751. Byzantine influence persisted in some coastal areas of southern Italy until the late 11th century, while the interior was ruled by Lombard dukes based at Benevento and later also at Salerno and Capua.

== Scholarly assessment ==
Scholars generally regard Justinian’s attempt to restore Roman authority in the former western provinces as an ambitious and significant imperial undertaking. The campaigns of generals such as Belisarius and Narses demonstrated the effectiveness of the Byzantine army. In the short term, the Byzantine conquest of the Gothic kingdom was successful. However, modern scholarship also views the war for its devastating consequences, highlighting that prolonged warfare, plague, famine, and the collapse of agricultural production severely weakened the Italian population and economy. As such, any gains were unsustainable. Byzantine control of Italy lasted only a few decades before the Lombard invasion of 568. Consequently, the Gothic War is assessed as both a military accomplishment and a strategic miscalculation, as it undermined the long-term stability of Byzantine Italy and exhausted the Byzantine Empire's reserves.

The Gothic War ended the symbiotic dual-state system established under Gothic rule, which had previously allowed the senatorial aristocracy to maintain traditional landholdings, civic roles, and administrative duties. The senatorial elite suffered heavy losses at the hands of the Goths, most notably when Teia executed 300 children of senators taken as hostages—effectively wiping out a generation of Rome's future leadership. Even after the war ended, the return of senators, who had taken refuge at Constantinople, the Byzantine administration diminished the administrative role of the Senate, giving rise to localized, regional identities focused around local bishops and the Papacy.

Following the harsh taxation imposed by Justinian in 540, the Italian population increasingly came to view the Byzantine forces as occupiers rather than liberators. Both Vitiges and Totila sought to reinforce this perception by referring to the Byzantines as "Greeks", attempting to bring the Italian population to their side. Conversely, the Byzantines viewed the Italian population not as compatriots, but as compromised subjects who had been living among the "barbarians". While senators of Rome were featured prominently in Procopius's contemporary accounts, Agathias, writing roughly two decades after picking up where Procopius's narrative ended, presents the Italian population as neither barbarian nor Roman. The diminishing imperial citizenship and later Lombard invasion laid the foundation for the independent Italian city-states that emerged in the following centuries.

== Sources ==
=== Primary ===
- Cassiodorus, Variae epistolae ("Letters"), at Project Gutenberg
- Procopius (1914) [545–553 AD]. Procopius: History of the Wars, Books V and VI. Translated by Bronson Dewing, Henry. Cambridge, MA: Harvard University Press.
- Procopius (1924) [545–553 AD]. Procopius: History of the Wars, Books VI and VII. Translated by Bronson Dewing, Henry. Cambridge, MA: Harvard University Press.
- Procopius (1914) [545–553 AD]. Procopius: History of the Wars, Books VII and VIII. Translated by Bronson Dewing, Henry. Cambridge, Massachusetts: Harvard University Press. OCLC 1360345904.

=== Secondary ===
- Amory, Patrick (2003). People and Identity in Ostrogothic Italy, 489–554. Cambridge University Press. ISBN 978-0-521-52635-7.
- Barker, John W. (1966). Justinian and the Later Roman Empire. University of Wisconsin Press. ISBN 9780299039448.
- Bury, John Bagnell (1958) [1923]. History of the Later Roman Empire: From the Death of Theodosius I to the Death of Justinian. Vol. 1. Mineola, New York: Dover Publications, Inc. OCLC 537268.
- Bury, John Bagnell (1958) [1923]. History of the Later Roman Empire: From the Death of Theodosius I to the Death of Justinian. Vol. 2. Mineola, New York: Dover Publications, Inc. OCLC 1240424678.
- DeForest, Dallas (2020). "Agathias on Italy, Italians and the Gothic War". Revista de Estudios Bizantinos. 8: 61–81. doi:10.1344/EBizantinos2020.8.2. ISSN 2014-9999.
- Heather, Peter J. (2018). Rome Resurgent: War and Empire in the Age of Justinian. Oxford: Oxford University Press. ISBN 9780199362745.
- Hughes, Ian (2009). Belisarius: The Last Roman General. Yardley, PA: Westholme Publishing. ISBN 9781594160851. OCLC 294885267.
- Jacobsen, Torsten C. (2009). The Gothic War, Rome's Final Conflict with the West. Yardley, PA: Westholme. ISBN 978-1-59416-084-4. OCLC 294885264.
- La Rocca, Cristina (2002). Italy in the Early Middle Ages: 476–1000. Short Oxford History of Italy. Oxford: Oxford University Press. ISBN 0-19-870048-2.
- Norwich, John Julius (1988). Byzantium: The Early Centuries. London: Penguin. ISBN 978-0-670-80251-7.
- Sarris, Peter (2023). Justinian: Emperor, Soldier, Saint. New York: Basic Books. ISBN 978-1-529-36541-2.
- Salzman, Michele R. (2021). The Falls of Rome: Crises, Resilience, and Resurgence in Late Antiquity. Cambridge: Cambridge University Press. ISBN 978-1-10-711142-4.
- Syvänne, Ilkka (2021). Military History of Late Rome 518–565. Yorkshire, PA: Pen and Sword Military. ISBN 978-1-4738-9530-0.
- Thompson, Edward Arthur (1982). Romans and Barbarians: Decline of the Western Empire. Madison: University of Wisconsin Press. ISBN 978-0-299-08700-5.
- Treadgold, Warren (1997). A History of the Byzantine State and Society. Stanford University Press. ISBN 978-0-8047-2630-6.
- Whitby, Michael (2021). The Wars of Justinian. Pen & Sword Military. ISBN 978-1-52676-088-3.
- Wijnendaele, Jeroen W. P. (2023). "Italy and its Place in the Roman Empire of Late Antiquity". In Late Roman Italy: Imperium to Regnum. Edinburgh: Edinburgh University Press. pp. 1–11. ISBN 978-1-3995-1804-8.
- Wolfram, Herwig (1988). History of the Goths. Berkeley, Los Angeles and London: University of California Press. ISBN 0-520-06983-8.
