= Ildibad =

6th-century Ostrogothic king

Ildibad 𐌹𐌻𐌳𐌹𐌱𐌰𐌳
- King of the Ostrogoths
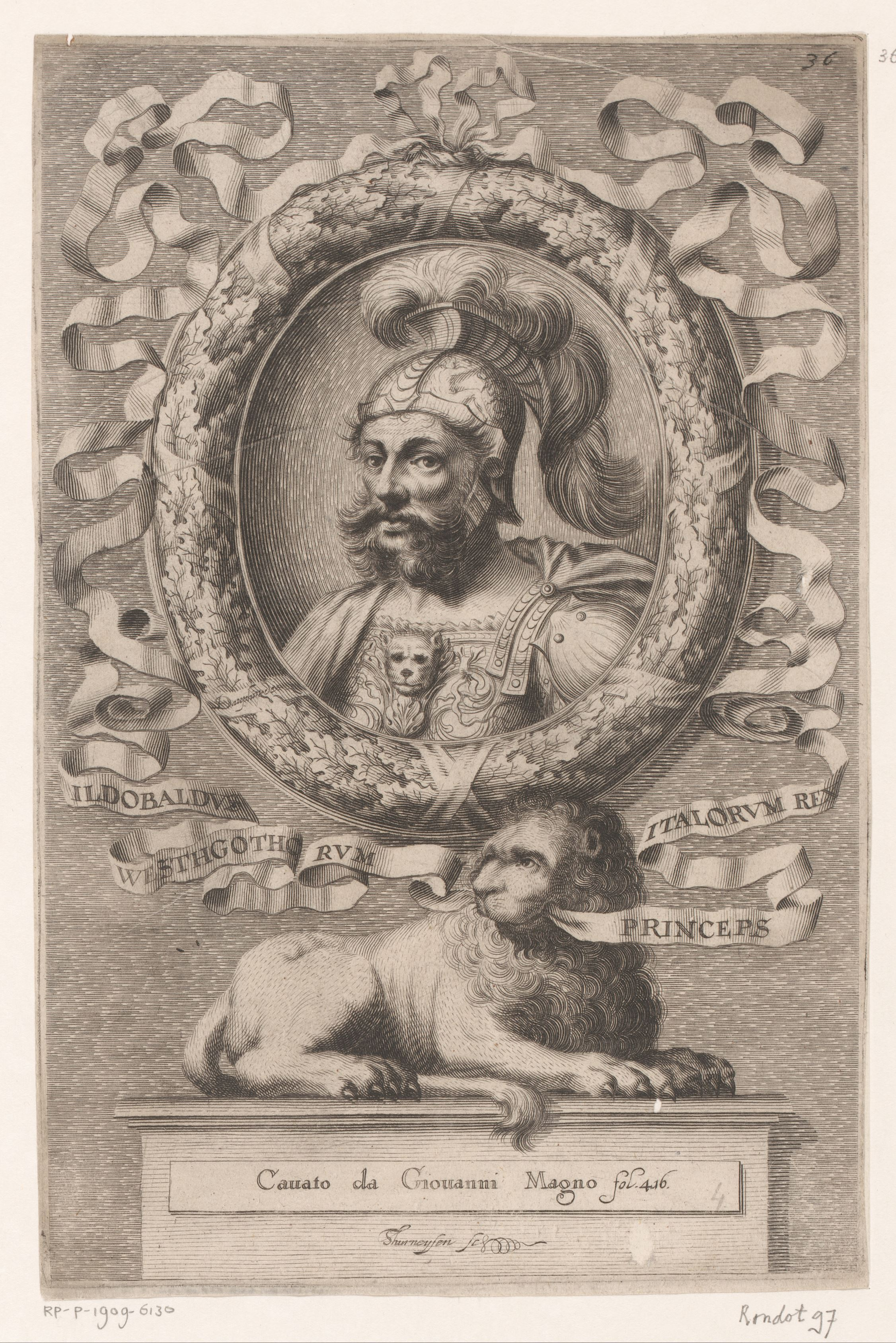
- Engraving of Ildibad in the works of Emanuele Tesauro (1664)
- Reign: c. Late summer 540 – May 541
- Predecessor: Vitiges
- Successor: Eraric
- Died: 541

Ildibad (Note: Also spelled as Ildebad, Ildebadus, Hildebad, Hildibad or Heldebadus) (died 541) was a king of the Ostrogoths (Goths) who ruled from 540 to 541 during the middle stage of the Gothic War with the Byzantine Empire.

After the capture of the Gothic king Witiges by the Byzantine general Belisarius during the fall of Ravenna, the nephew of the king, Uraias, refused the crown and instead suggested Ildibad, who was then chosen as king by the remaining Gothic forces in northern Italy. He inherited a kingdom reduced to a small territory around the cities of Pavia and Verona. Despite these difficulties, he took advantage of poor coordination among Byzantine commanders and rebuilt the Gothic forces.

Ildibad defeated Byzantine forces led by Vitalius near Treviso. The victory helped him regain control over much of the Po Valley. He also attracted both Gothic supporters and Byzantine deserters dissatisfied with the Byzantine administration. However, his reign was short, marked by internal political tensions that resulted in the murder of Uraias. In May 541, Ildibad was murdered at a royal banquet by one of his bodyguards. His death caused a brief succession crisis, after which his nephew Totila became king and led the Gothic resurgence against the Byzantines.

== Biography ==
Ildibad was a nephew of Theudis, an Ostrogoth (Goth) king of the Visigoths in Spain. This relationship led historian Peter Heather to suggest that both belonged to a powerful, non-royal clan. The Gothic king at the time, Witiges, had failed to stop the advance of Byzantines under Belisarius, and in 540, they had surrounded the capital of the Ostrogothic kingdom, Ravenna. The Gothic aristocracy initially offered Belisarius the crown of the Western Roman Empire, who pretended to accept to gain entry. In May 540, the Byzantine army entered Ravenna, and Belisarius took Witiges and Ildibad's children as prisoners. Ildibad was one of the Goths north of the Po river who still refused to surrender to Byzantine authority, but attempted to negotiate terms of surrender with Belisarius, presumably due to the fate of his children.

After the departure of Belisarius in mid-summer 540, it became clear to the Goths that Belisarius had no intention of accepting the crown. The leading candidate for the Gothic throne became Uraias, Witiges's nephew, a skilled military commander who was in charge of Ticinum (modern day Pavia). Uraias, however, declined because his family lacked "royal fortune", and instead suggested Ildibad, who was at that time in charge of Verona. These were the only cities still held by the Goths at this time. After being elected king in 540, Ildibad moved his capital to Pavia. Ildibad again attempted to negotiate a surrender, but after Belisarius sailed to Constantinople along with Witiges and Ildibad's family, the war resumed. The Gothic territory at this time consisted only of a narrow strip of land between Pavia and Verona, while the army consisted of barely 1,000 men, although this number was growing.

The lack of coordination among the remaining Byzantine commanders enabled Ildibad to extend his authority throughout Liguria and Venetia. In 541 he was engaged outside the heavily defended city of Treviso by its military commander Vitalius and a sizable body of Herules. The battle was a decisive victory for the Goths, with Vitalius barely escaping while the Heruli leader was killed. His nephew Totila then became military commander of Treviso. Ildibad was subsequently able to extend his authority across the entire Po Valley. The victory gave him increased support among the Goths, while the harsh Byzantine taxation of the provinces and lack of coordination among generals enabled him to acquire many Byzantine deserters.

In 541, Ildibad had Uraias murdered. According to contemporary historian Procopius, Uraias's murder had been instigated by Ildibad's wife, who felt insulted by the lavish lifestyle of Uraias's wife. Historian Herwig Wolfram suggests that this is an invention by Procopius to "personalize" the causes of political events, and that the real reason for Uraias' murder was that the Witiges clan had allied with non-Gothic barbarians, including the Rugii and probably Gepids, to conspire against Ildibad's rule.

In May 541, Ildibad was murdered at a royal banquet by his Gepid bodyguard Velas whose Gothic lover was married off to someone else by Ildibad while Velas was away. According to a story provided by Procopius, Velas struck Ildibad so quickly during the banquet that, when the king's head fell to the ground his hand was still holding the food he had been eating. The lack of a suitable Gothic successor enabled the Rugians to make their chief Eraric king of the Goths. Eraric, however, betrayed the Goths and secretly offered to surrender the Gothic kingdom to the Byzantines in return for money. As a result, the Goths at Pavia offered Ildibad's nephew Totila the throne. Totila was at that point himself negotiating with the imperial commander at Ravenna, and demanded the killing of Eraric if he was to accept the throne. After Eraric was killed in October 541, Totila became king of the Goths, a title he held for more than ten years.

== Sources ==
- Bury, J. B. (2013). History of the Later Roman Empire, Vol. 2: From the Death of Theodosius I to the Death of Justinian. Courier Corporation. ISBN 978-0486143392.
- Heather, Peter (2018). Rome Resurgent: War and Empire in the Age of Justinian. Oxford University Press. ISBN 9780199362769.
- —————— (1998). The Goths. Wiley. ISBN 0631209328.
- Tesauro, Emanuele (1664). Del regno d'Italia sotto i barbari. Turin: Bartolomeo Zavatta. OCLC 12737663.
- Wolfram, Herwig (1990). History of the Goths. Translated by Thomas J. Dunlap (New revised ed.). University of California Press. ISBN 0520069838.

Regnal titles
Preceded by Witiges	King of the Ostrogoths; 540–541	Succeeded by Eraric
