= Vitiges =

6th-century king of the Italian Ostrogoths

Vitiges 𐍅𐌴𐌹𐍄𐌹𐌲𐌴𐌹𐍃𐌻𐍃
- King of the Ostrogoths
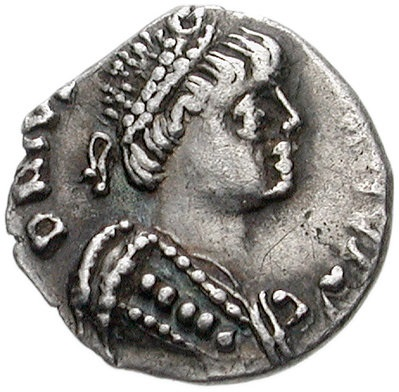
- Quarter-siliqua coin of Vitiges
- Reign: November 536 – May 540
- Predecessor: Theodahad
- Successor: Ildibad
- Born: c. 480
- Died: 542
- Spouse: Mataswintha

Vitiges (Note: Also known as Vitigis, Vitigo, Witigis, Witiges, Vvitiges, Wittigis or Wittigeis and in Old Norse as Vigo) (c. 480–542) was ruler of the Ostrogothic Kingdom in Italy from 536 to 540 during the Gothic War between the Ostrogoths and the Byzantine Empire under Justinian I.

Vitiges came from humble roots and had a respected military career under Theodoric the Great, later becoming one of the king's bodyguards and adviser to King Athalaric. Under King Theodahad, he became leader of the king's bodyguards and the Gothic forces in Rome. He rose to power after the overthrow of Theodahad, whose failure to counter the Byzantines at the onset of the Gothic War had angered the Gothic nobility. To strengthen his legitimacy, Vitiges forced a marriage to Mataswintha, the granddaughter of Theodoric and daughter of Amalaswintha.

His reign began during a period of crisis, as the Byzantine general Belisarius had already conquered Sicily, much of southern Italy, and Rome in December 536. Vitiges attempted to halt the Byzantine advance by besieging Rome in 537 with superior numbers but the defenders under Belisarius resisted the assault. After a year-long siege, he withdrew from Rome and concentrated on defending northern Italy and the Gothic capital at Ravenna, while seeking allies against the Byzantines. In 540, Vitiges found himself trapped in the capital as Byzantine forces increased their control of the surrounding region. He agreed with the Gothic nobility to offer to Belisarius the crown of the Western Roman Empire. Belisarius pretended to accept, but once inside the city, took Vitiges captive, and brought him to Constantinople. Vitiges died there in 542 without heirs, marking the end of his reign.

== Early life ==
Little information is known about the early life of Vitiges. He came from an undistinguished family, presumably born c. 480. He was a career soldier, similar to his uncle and nephew. He gained prominence during the reign of Theodoric the Great in the siege of Sirmium of 504–505 but did not receive any titles. He became a spatharios, part of the king's bodyguards, and also adviser to King Athalaric, and he fought again at Sirmium in the late 520s. Later, he served under King Theodahad, who appointed him armiger, commander of the king's bodyguard and leader of the Gothic forces in Rome.

== Gothic War and rise to power ==
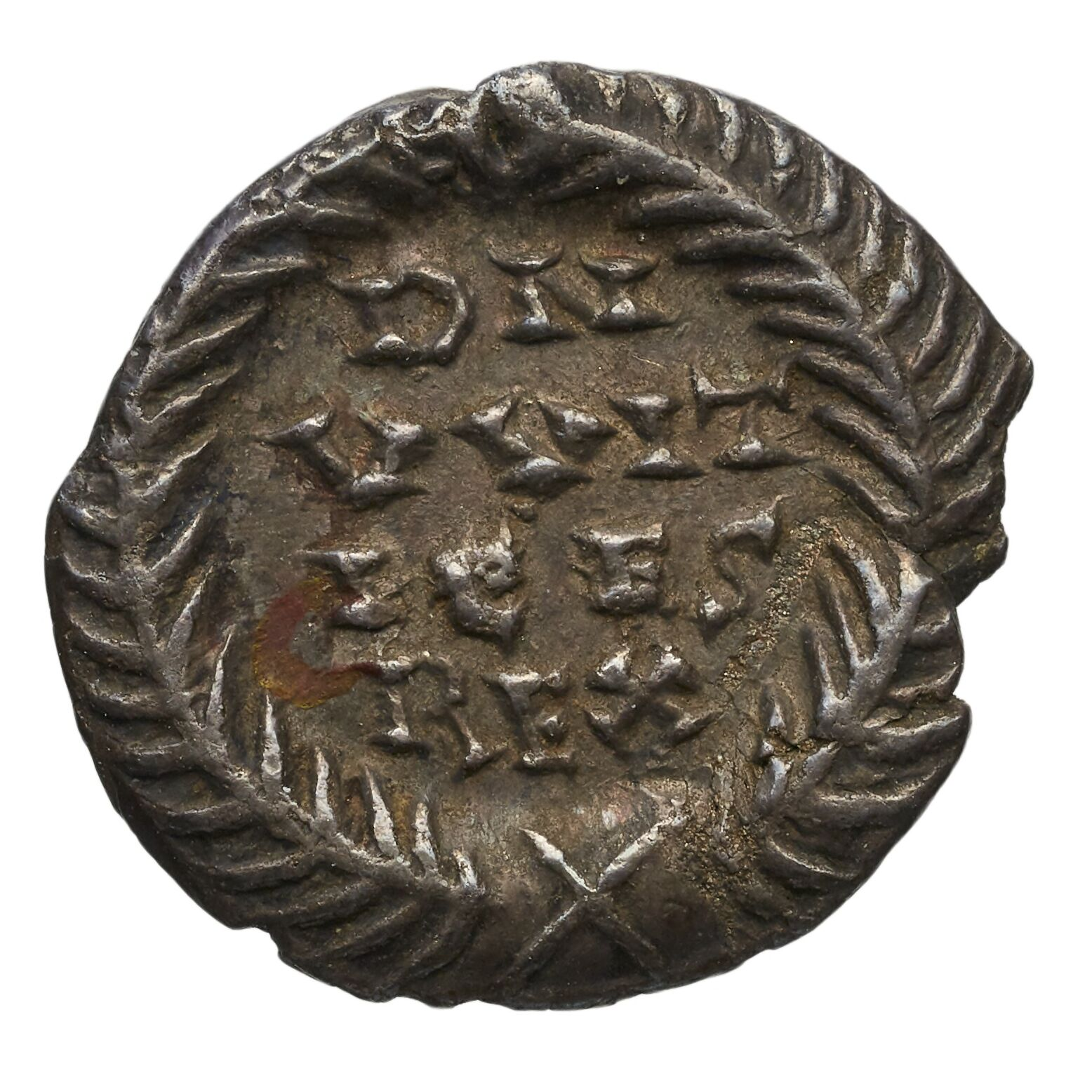
Coin issued by Vitiges in Ravenna: DN VVITIGES REX, "Our Lord King Witiges."

The Gothic War started in 535, when the Byzantine general Belisarius had secured Sicily, and in the following year, rapidly advanced through the south of Italy and captured Naples after the siege of 536. King Theodahad's failure to reinforce Naples angered the Gothic nobility. In late 536, nobles and military officers gathered near Regata in the Pontine Marshes and proclaimed Vitiges as their new king. Theodahad attempted to flee toward the capital of Ravenna, but Vitiges dispatched an agent to intercept him, and overtook and killed him. Once in Rome, Vitiges imprisoned Theodahad's son.

Vitiges had two immediate challenges; he did not wish to face the Byzantines in Rome as war preparations were incomplete and most of the Gothic forces were divided, facing the Franks in the west, Byzantines under General Constantinianus in the east in Dalmatia, and General Belisarius in the south. Before departing for Ravenna, Vitiges left a garrison of 4000 men in Rome and took several senators of Rome hostage to ensure the city's loyalty. Second, a crisis of legitimacy due to the lack of royal blood forced Vitiges to strengthen his claim. He traveled to Ravenna and, after divorcing his wife, forced a marriage to Mataswintha, the only surviving child of Queen Amalaswintha and the granddaughter of Theodoric. This union was celebrated with a panegyric delivered by the Roman senator Cassiodorus. This speech aimed to frame Vitiges not as a usurper, but as the protector of Theodoric's legacy.

Vitiges then proceeded to negotiate with the Merovingian Franks, who were allied with Byzantium. Theodahad had proposed handing over territories in Gaul along with 2000 pounds of gold in return for their agreement to assist him in the war. Theodahad died before the transaction was concluded, and Vitiges sought to complete this arrangement. The Frankish kings agreed, but they were unwilling openly to break their alliance with Emperor Justinian I. Instead, they secretly promised to send warriors drawn from their tributary peoples to maintain the fiction of alliance.

== Siege of Rome ==
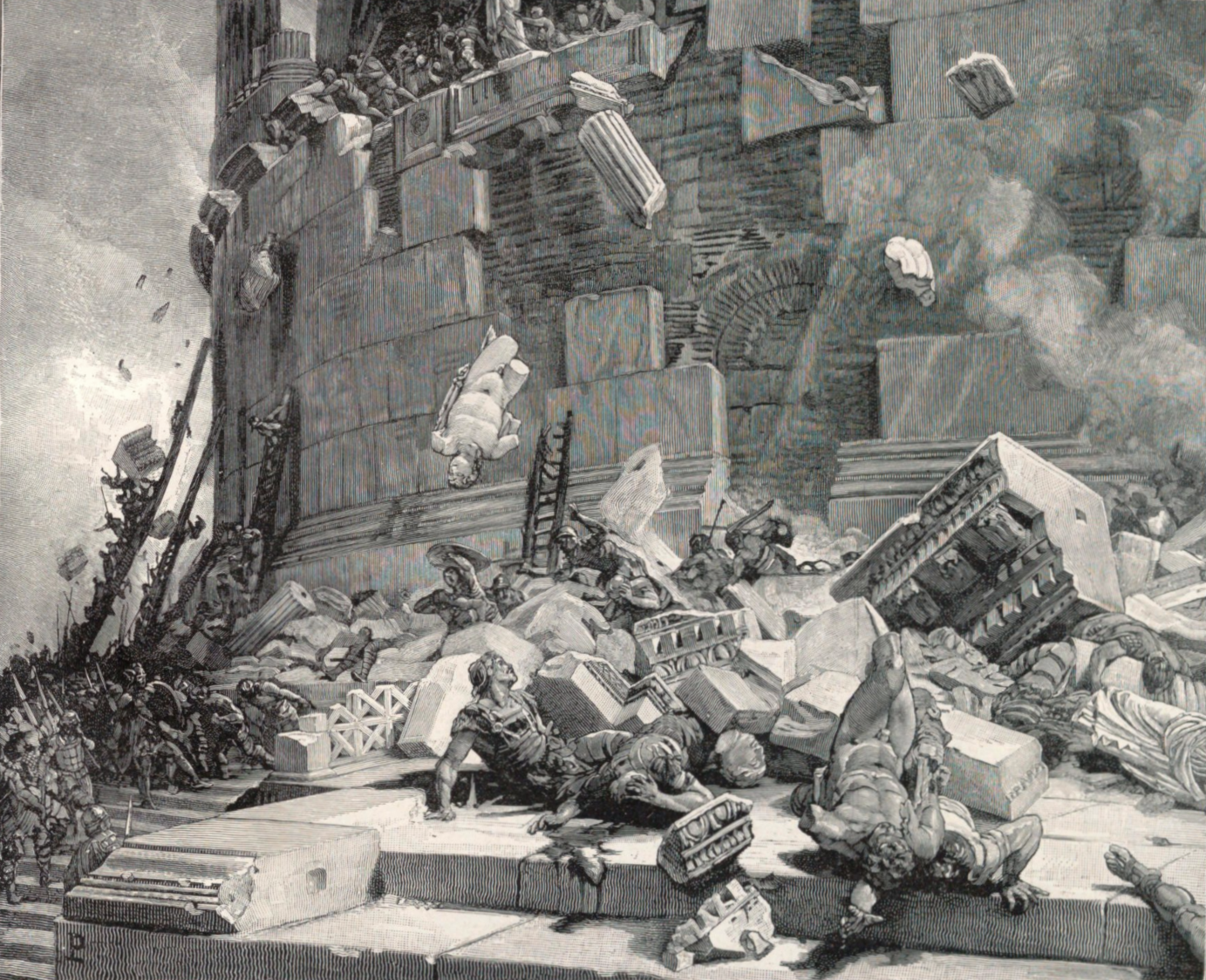
Vitiges besieging Rome near the Mausoleum of Hadrian in 537, by Lodovico Pogliaghi.

The citizens of Rome, fearing a siege and encouraged by Pope Silverius, expelled the Goths and opened the gates to Belisarius on 9 December 536. Determined to retake Rome, Vitiges returned in early 537 with a large army to besiege Rome; the contemporary historian Procopius reports a 150,000-strong army. (Note: Modern historians doubt this number, providing lower estimates, but without a clear consensus: Ian Hughes considers 20,000–25,000, Leif Petersen estimates at 25,000–30,000, Dupuy estimates 50,000. The historians Torsten Jacobsen and Ilkka Syvänne argued that Procopius's number should not be doubted as the Gothic army was a national army in which every able male had to participate, and the peace and prosperity of the last decades had increased the population. Will Durant also used Procopius's number.) Soon after the siege started, Vitiges gave orders for the senatorial hostages held in Ravenna to be executed. Vitiges ordered several assaults on the Aurelian Walls, but he was countered by Belisarius's defensive preparations, use of artillery and sorties of Byzantine mounted archers employing hit-and-run tactics, which caused significant Gothic casualties.

The siege lasted for a year, with both sides suffering from shortages and disease. The Byzantine control of sea supply routes gradually weakened the besieging Goths, who faced greater challenges in supplying their large army by land. In March 538, Belisarius sent John the Sanguinary to raid Picenum. John acted beyond his orders and captured Ariminum, which was close to Ravenna. Vitiges lifted the siege on 12 March 538 and his army marched to recapture Ariminum. In his march north, Vitiges reinforced nearby towns under his rule to protect his rear. He sent 2000 troops under Moras to defend the fortified town of Urbinus and 1000 men under Albilas to Urviventus. In Tuscany, he sent Gibimer to Clusium with 1000 men. The stronghold of Auximus was reinforced with 4,000 men under Visandus. Other cities included, Tudera with 400 men, Petra with 400 men, Caesana and Monteferetra were garrisoned with 500 men each.

== Siege of Ariminum ==
First phase of the Gothic War campaigns

Upon arrival, presumably in late spring 538, Vitiges besieged Ariminum and used a man-powered siege tower. The Byzantine garrison, led by John, covertly dug a trench overnight to block its advance. When Vitiges ordered the trench filled with faggots to push the machine through, the tower's weight caused it to sink and become immobilized. Vitiges executed the night guards of the tower for this oversight. Then, he decided to starve the defenders. Needing fewer troops, he sent a detachment to capture Ancona. In late summer 538, Belisarius devised a plan to break the siege of Ariminum by using psychological warfare and deceptive tactics to inflate the Byzantine army's size: despite reinforcements, they were still outnumbered by the Goths. The Goths thought a large army was approaching and panicked. Vitiges abandoned the siege and retreated to Ravenna.

== Seeking allies and fall of Mediolanum and Auximus ==
In April 538, the Byzantines captured Mediolanum with a small army as well as the nearby towns of Bergamum, Comum, and Novaria, which were necessary to secure Liguria. The loss of Liguria alarmed the Goths, who had deposited significant parts of their wealth there. Acting on the news, Vitiges sent Uraias, his nephew, with an army to recover Mediolanum, assisted by Burgundians sent by the Franks. During the siege, the city endured severe famine as relief efforts by the Byzantines were delayed due to disputes among their leadership. Eventually, Mediolanum capitulated in March 539. The Goths killed the male inhabitants as punishment for the city's earlier revolt, and the women were sold to the Burgundians as a reward for their assistance in the siege. (Note: The contemporary historian, Procopius, recorded that the Goths executed 300,000 men. Historian John Bury argued this number may be exaggerated. Bury noted that, according to this figure, Milan had a population of approximately 600,000, similar to its modern day population.) After the city was razed, the Goths recovered much of the Liguria region.

In early 539, Vitiges was considering asking for help. Initially, he asked Wacho, king of the Langobardi. Wacho refused him because he was allied with Justinian and did not want to spoil his reputation by breaking the alliance. The Goths considered asking Khosrow I, the Sasanian emperor, on the grounds that the Byzantines would not be able to continue campaigning in Italy while maintaining an open front in the east. They paid two Ligurian priests to deliver a letter to Khosrow by passing through the Byzantine territories without detection. Khosrow received the letter with interest, since he viewed Belisarius's conquests in Italy with concern. Justinian learned about the communication between the Goths and Persians and recognized the perils of fighting on two fronts. The Byzantines tried to make peace with the Goths. For Justinian, the Persians were the greater threat and peace in Italy would free Belisarius to take command on the eastern front.

Vitiges remained in Ravenna, unable to send an expeditionary army to assist Gothic garrisons besieged by the Byzantines due to a lack of supplies. During the siege of Auximus, the Gothic garrison twice requested assistance from their king, and each time Vitiges promised to send a relief force but remained inactive. He ordered Uraias to assist Auximus but he was unable to do so because Byzantine troops blocked the way and later a large Frankish army invaded, attacking the Goths and the Byzantines. The Frankish army retreated due to disease and poor supplies. Auximus and Faesulae, key strongholds for the defense of Ravenna, capitulated due to famine in late 539.

== Siege of Ravenna ==
By 540, the Byzantines encircled Ravenna, trapping Vitiges. Justinian was under threat of a Sasanian invasion, which required bringing Belisarius from Italy to the eastern front. Justinian offered a modified plan, which Vitiges had proposed in late 537. Justinian's plan called for a partition of Italy, in which the Goths would keep the territories north of the river Po and the royal treasury in Ravenna would be equally divided. The plan was generous and the Goths fully embraced it. Belisarius, as one of the generals in the field that had to ratify the peace treaty, refused to do so. Around the same time, the Gothic nobility, fearful that they might be transferred to the east and never allowed to return, secretly offered to Belisarius the throne of the Western Roman Empire. The Goths knew that Vitiges' days as king were numbered, yet they admired the Byzantine general as a man and as a soldier. When Vitiges found out, he provided his support and even sent a message urging him to accept the offer. Belisarius feigned agreement to gain entry. In May 540, the Goths opened the gates and the Byzantine army entered the city. Once inside the gates, he seized the royal treasury and took Vitiges and Mataswintha captive, ending Vitiges's reign. The king was transported to Constantinople to be presented to Justinian in mid-summer 540.

== Later life and death ==
In Constantinople, Vitiges was treated honorably, with Justinian granting him the title Patrikios and remaining ruler of Transpadane Italy, bound to Byzantium by treaty. Vitiges lived for two years before dying in 542 without any heirs.

== Legacy ==
Scholars assess Vitiges' leadership as lacking foresight and tactical adaptability. While he maintained military discipline and cohesion among his troops under heavy fire, he failed to counter the Byzantines' mounted archers with their hit-and-run tactics and his attempts to emulate those tactics backfired because his own troops lacked long-distance missile capabilities. He was unable to maintain pressure on the defenses, allowing the Byzantines free movement toward the end of the siege of Rome.

In Germanic heroic legends, the historical Vitiges is represented by the mythical figure of Witege, whose political surrender of Ravenna is portrayed as a betrayal. Entrusted with the city by King Dietrich von Bern (reimagining Theodoric the Great), Witege breaks his bond of loyalty by handing the keys to Dietrich's enemy, semi-legendary Gothic king Ermenrich, leading to a brutal slaughter of its citizens. The ultimate betrayal occurs later during the Battle of Ravenna when Witege kills Dietrich's young brother and the sons of King Etzel. The enraged and vengeful Dietrich pursues Witege to the seashore, where he is saved when his ancestral sea-spirit, Wachilde, pulls him into the waves to live in exile.

Vitiges is portrayed by Florin Piersic in the 1968 film The Last Roman.

== See also ==
Regnal titles
Preceded by Theodahad	King of the Ostrogoths; 536–540	Succeeded by Ildibad
