= Eraric =

6th-century Ostrogothic king

Eraric 𐌴𐍂𐌰𐍂𐌹𐌺𐍃
- King of the Ostrogoths
- Reign: c. May - c. October 541
- Predecessor: Ildibad
- Successor: Totila
- Died: c. October 541

Eraric, Heraric or Ariaric, the Rugian (died 541), was briefly King of the Ostrogoths.

== Reign ==
He was elected as the most distinguished among the Rugians in the confederation of the Ostrogoths. The Goths were vexed at the presumption of the Rugians, but nevertheless they recognized Eraric. He summoned a council directed to convincing the confederation to make peace with the Eastern Roman emperor Justinian, under Roman suzerainty. The Ostrogoths opposed the truce under the negotiations, and they instead elected Ildibad's nephew Totila. Soon afterwards Eraric was killed by Totila's followers after a reign of five months from May to October.

Regnal titles
Preceded by Ildibad	King of the Ostrogoths; 541	Succeeded by Totila
