= Battle of Nisibis (541) =

Battle during the Byzantine-Persian War

- Part of Belisarius' invasion of Mesopotamia (541)
- Byzantine-Sassanian frontier in the 6th century
Date	541 AD
Location	Nisibis, Sasanian Empire (modern-day Nusaybin, Mardin, Turkey) 37.0753°N 41.2157°E
Result	Inconclusive

Belligerents
Byzantine Empire; Goths; Ghassanids	Sasanian Empire

Commanders and leaders
Belisarius; Peter; John Troglita	Nabedes

Strength
Unknown	Unknown

Casualties and losses
50 men	150 men

The Battle of Nisibis took place in 541 between Byzantine forces and the Sassanian (Persian) garrison of the frontier fortress of Nisibis.

At the onset of the Lazic War, Belisarius arrived on the eastern frontier to find Byzantine forces poorly equipped and demoralized. Byzantine Emperor Justinian I had also dismantled the eastern intelligence network, hindering the Byzantines' ability to anticipate Persian movements. Khosrow I had invaded Lazica after its envoys persuaded him of the strategic importance of controlling the Black Sea ports. He successfully concealed his intentions by spreading misinformation about a campaign against the Huns in Iberia.

After reorganizing his troops and receiving reports from his spies that no imminent Persian invasion was coming, Belisarius marched against the frontier fortress of Nisibis in 541. Belisarius chose an open and level area that favored Byzantine cavalry and provided enough space to pursue the enemy. Despite his warnings about a possible Persian attack at midday, his commanders Peter and John Troglita disregarded his orders. They camped near the city and let their troops eat at midday. The Persians under Nabedes exploited this opportunity and launched a surprise attack, routing the Byzantine forces. Belisarius intervened with his cavalry, composed of Gothic lancers, and led a charge that forced the Persians to retreat to Nisibis. Unable to capture fortified Nisibis, Belisarius advanced to Sisauranon, whose garrison surrendered the fortress to the Byzantines.

== Background ==
In the opening stage of the war between the Sasanian (Persian) Empire and Byzantine Empire in 540, envoys from the kingdom of Lazica, a Byzantine client kingdom at the time, persuaded Khosrow I to invade the region. This attracted Khosrow's attention because control of the Black Sea ports would let the Persians threaten the capital of Byzantium, Constantinople, by sea after building a navy. Khosrow concealed his invasion plans by spreading rumors that he intended to fight the Huns in Iberia. This led to the fall of Petra in 541, marking the start of the Lazic War.

The general Belisarius arrived in Constantinople after the first phase of the Gothic War ended in mid-summer 540, bringing with him Gothic reinforcements. Byzantine Emperor Justinian I appointed him magister militum per Orientem. However, Belisarius's delayed deployment (in spring 541, instead of fall 540) on the eastern frontier, coupled with the dismantling of the eastern intelligence network, left the Byzantines unable to anticipate Persian movements. Upon reaching Dara, Belisarius also found the Byzantine forces at the frontier poorly equipped and demoralized. He began reorganizing the troops and gathering intelligence in Persian territory. However, his spies reported Khosrow's deception that the Persians were occupied in fighting the Huns in Iberia, while in reality at the time Khosrow was invading Lazica. (Note: Contemporary historian Procopius argued that the deception would have failed had Justinian preserved the eastern intelligence network, which had previously provided access to the Persian royal court.) Based on the available information, Belisarius decided to invade Persian territory, targeting the frontier fortress of Nisibis. Two of his commanders raised concerns that withdrawing their troops would expose Phoenicia and Syria to Arab attacks. Belisarius reassured them that the Arabs traditionally suspended warfare during the vernal equinox. With their concerns addressed, the Byzantine commanders agreed to launch the offensive.

== Battle ==
Upon arriving at Nisibis, Belisarius chose an open and level area with abundant water, favoring Byzantine cavalry tactics and providing enough space to pursue the Persians. The officers raised loud objections, wanting to camp closer to the city. He argued to his commanders that fighting closer to Nisibis would give the enemy a safe retreat, whereas fighting farther away would provide enough room to pursue effectively. Additionally, Belisarius warned the commanders to keep their troops ready at midday, when Byzantine soldiers traditionally stopped to eat, as he anticipated a Persian attack.

Two Byzantine commanders, Peter and John Troglita, ignored the orders of Belisarius. They camped ten stades from the city and let their troops eat lunch, allowing the Persians under Nabedes to launch a surprise attack. Peter and John's disorganized forces were routed. Belisarius's cavalry was nearby, because he had seen the dust raised by the horses and engaged the Persian cavalry in time, preventing heavier losses. The Byzantine Gothic lancers led a charge that drove the Persians back to Nisibis, killing 150 Persians. The Byzantines lost 50 of their own, and they lost Peter's standard.

Historian Ilkka Syvänne notes a disagreement between the two surviving primary sources. Contemporary historian Corippus presents a more heroic version of events, in which the Byzantines had no setbacks, and portrays John as leading a successful charge against the Nabedes and pursuing the Persians to the gates of Nisibis. However, his account omits the initial Byzantine defeat. Procopius's narrative emphasizes the disobedience of Peter and John. Syvänne considers that the two narratives can be reconciled: after Belisarius intervened, John regrouped his troops and pursued the retreating Persians.

== Aftermath ==
Recognizing that Nisibis's fortifications and garrison were too strong to be taken by direct assault, Belisarius bypassed the city and reached Sisauranon, another frontier Persian fortress. Despite a failed assault, the garrison defected because it was low on supplies. However, Belisarius had to retreat back to Byzantine territories because a third of the soldiers were incapacitated by fever and exhaustion from the extreme heat and dry climate of Mesopotamia. The capture of Sisauranon forced Khosrow to retreat to his homeland despite having the advantage in Lazica.
