= Battle of Taginae =

Battle of the Gothic War in 552 AD

- Part of the Gothic War (535–554)
- Main army movements during the second phase of the Gothic War
Date	July 552 AD
Location	Near Taginae, Etruria (Note: The exact location of the battle is unknown. Historian J. B. Bury provides a summary of the various positions. Procopius states that Narses left the Via Flaminia on his left, indicating that he turned inland between Ariminum and Fanum, and he likely rejoined the Via Flaminia near Acqualagna before advancing toward the battlefield. Despite the alignment among historians on Narses's army path, the location of Narses's camp is less clear. Procopius mentions Busta Gallorum, which early historian Cluverius identifies as a small village named Bosta or Basta a few miles west of Fabriano. Giuseppe Colucci agrees with Cluverius and concludes that the battle of Narses was fought in the plain south of Sassoferrato. Historian Thomas Hodgkin presents a different view, arguing that the battle took place somewhere south of Scheggia and north of Tadino, and ignoring Procopius's Busta Gallorum. Bury considers that Totila's camp was more likely at Fossato village, whose name means "the Camp". Since Fossato had no Byzantine station, Procopius's sources may have identified it by the nearby station of Tadinae or Helvillum.)
Result	Byzantine victory

Belligerents
Byzantine Empire	Ostrogothic Kingdom

Commanders and leaders
Narses; Valerianus; John	Totila (DOW); Teia

Strength
Larger force (Note: Contemporary historian Procopius does not provide the exact army size under Narses. There are various estimates by historians: Ian Hughes supported the suggestion of Warren Treadgold of 20,000, while J. B. Bury considered no more than 25,000 (of which 11,000 were foreign mercenaries). E. A. Thompson considered an army size of 25,000–30,000. Ilkka Syvänne provided a higher estimate of 35,000–40,000 men. The Oxford Dictionary of Byzantium states that Byzantines had a two-to-one numerical superiority, but does not provide exact numbers.)	Smaller force (Note: Procopius emphasizes the numerical superiority of the Byzantines over the Goths. E. A. Thompson considered an army size of 15,000–20,000, composed of Goths and Byzantine deserters. Historian Ilkka Syvänne provided an estimate of 20,000 men. The Oxford Dictionary of Byzantium states that Goths had a two-to-one numerical disadvantage, but does not provide exact numbers.)

Casualties and losses
Unknown	6,000 killed

The Battle of Taginae or Battle of Busta Gallorum took place in July 552 AD, where Byzantines led by Narses defeated the Ostrogoths (Goths) under King Totila in the late stages of the Gothic War (535–554). The Byzantine victory paved the way for the Byzantine reconquest of the Italian Peninsula and the dissolution of the Gothic Kingdom.

After Totila restored Gothic control over much of the Italian Peninsula, Emperor Justinian appointed his chamberlain, Narses, to assemble an army to bring the war to an end. Narses assembled his army at Salona, Dalmatia and from there marched along the coast of Adriatic Sea to Italy. Despite obstacles laid by the Goths, the Byzantines were able to cross the river Po and reach Ravenna. After a nine-day break, Narses continued south along the Via Flaminia road towards Rome. Totila, realizing that a defensive strategy was not viable, marched to intercept the Byzantines at Taginae.

Despite his numerical superiority, Narses placed his troops in a defensive position on the battlefield with archers at the flanks protected by natural terrain. Totila used delaying tactics until reinforcements under Teia arrived. He then attempted a surprise attack by withdrawing his troops for lunch, hoping to tempt the Byzantines to pursue and abandon their position. Narses anticipated this ruse and prevented it by keeping his army in the original defensive position. Totila then reformed his army for a concentrated cavalry charge into the Byzantine center, composed of foreign mercenaries. The Gothic attack faltered after several volleys of arrows from Byzantine archers fired from both sides, inflicting heavy losses. The Byzantine center repelled the Gothic assault, and the cavalry retreat caused the Gothic infantry at the rear to panic and flee as well. Totila was mortally wounded during the battle.

The Byzantine victory opened the way for Narses to advance on Rome, which fell with little resistance. The Gothic defeat shattered their military resistance and paved the way for the Byzantine control of Italy.

== Primary sources ==
Procopius of Caesarea is the major Greek historian of late antiquity and the main source for Justinian I's reign of Byzantium. In Books V–VIII of the History of the Wars, published in 553 AD, Procopius described the Gothic War; as the sole contemporary source that covered these events, it is largely paraphrased by modern scholarship. Procopius was the assessor of the Byzantine general Belisarius. He witnessed military engagements with access to official information and records, and was closely familiar with military affairs. These advantages placed him in a unique position to reconstruct the wars in the Middle East, Africa, and Italy. Procopius adopted a classical style in narrating the events, inspired by historians such as Thucydides and Herodotus, emphasizing moral explanation through dramatic speeches over strict documentary accuracy.

Procopius's work is largely factual, and even though he was on the Byzantine side, it is neither entirely neutral nor propaganda. He portrayed Belisarius favorably over other Byzantine commanders, reflecting personal loyalty, and disproportionately emphasized mounted combat, marginalizing the role of infantry in battles and sieges. In the first part of the History of the Wars, the narrative follows Belisarius as the main protagonist until he left Italy in mid-summer 540 and his view of Justinian is characterized by enthusiasm and optimism. The narrative then shifts to the Gothic resurgence under Totila, who emerges as both the central figure and a tragic hero in Procopius's account of the later stages of the Gothic War. Procopius's disillusionment with Justinian's reign becomes clear in the unpublished book Secret History. In the Secret History, Procopius presents history as a moral struggle in which effective rulers maintain order, criticizing Justinian not for his imperial ambitions but for the disorder and instability his actions allegedly caused.

== Background ==
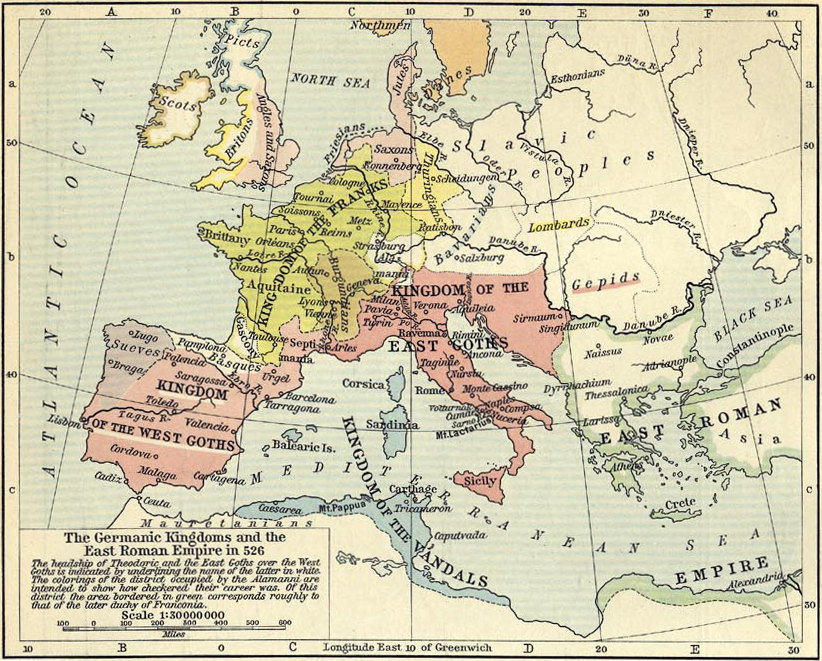
Map of the Byzantine (East Roman) Empire and the Germanic kingdoms of the western Mediterranean in 526

After the death of Theodoric the Great in 526, the Gothic state, centered in Italy, entered into a period of instability. His daughter Amalasuntha continued pro-Byzantine policies and maintained close ties with Emperor Justinian. She alienated the Gothic nobility because she relied on Byzantine advisers, sought a Roman rather than Gothic education for her son Athalaric, and tried to secure power as regent. Athalaric died in 534, at which point opposition intensified, and Theodahad deposed and murdered Amalasuntha in 535. Justinian used her death as a casus belli to invade Italy, launching the Gothic War under the pretext of restoring legitimate rule and Byzantine authority. Following the fall of Ravenna in May 540 AD, Belisarius restored Sicily and most of the Italian Peninsula to Byzantine rule. At the end, Belisarius's stratagem of inducing the Goths to surrender by offering him the Western imperial crown alarmed Emperor Justinian, who recalled him to Constantinople. Belisarius returned with Ravenna's treasury and the captive king Vitiges, but Justinian denied him a triumph and reassigned him to the eastern front ahead of the Lazic War (541–562). Belisarius was replaced by three coequal commanders, whose rivalry and corruption led to indiscipline and plundering of the Italian countryside. Justinian's harsh tax audit to recover alleged Gothic-era arrears, combined with reduced rewards for wounded and distinguished soldiers, further alienated troops and civilians, collapsing morale and eroding Italian loyalty.

Byzantine misrule strengthened the Goths under Ildibad, who defeated a Byzantine force at the Battle of Treviso and recovered much of the Po Valley. His reign was short-lived because he was assassinated before consolidating his power. The reign of Eraric followed, but it ended with his murder in late 541, after he secretly offered to abdicate and give the kingdom to the Byzantines in exchange for the rank of patrician and a large payment. Amid the turmoil among the Gothic aristocracy, Ildibad's nephew Totila became king. Reprimanded by Justinian for inaction to exploit Gothic disunity, the Byzantine commanders assembled to decide on a course of action. They decided to besiege Verona, however, they failed to capture it due to divided leadership. Totila took the initiative, pursued them and defeated a larger Byzantine army at the Battle of Faventia in spring 542. Advancing on Florence, Totila again routed Byzantine relief forces at the Battle of Mucellium. The Byzantines withdrew into fortified cities, while Totila bypassed central Italy and advanced rapidly to capture territories in southern Italy with the fall of Naples in March 543.

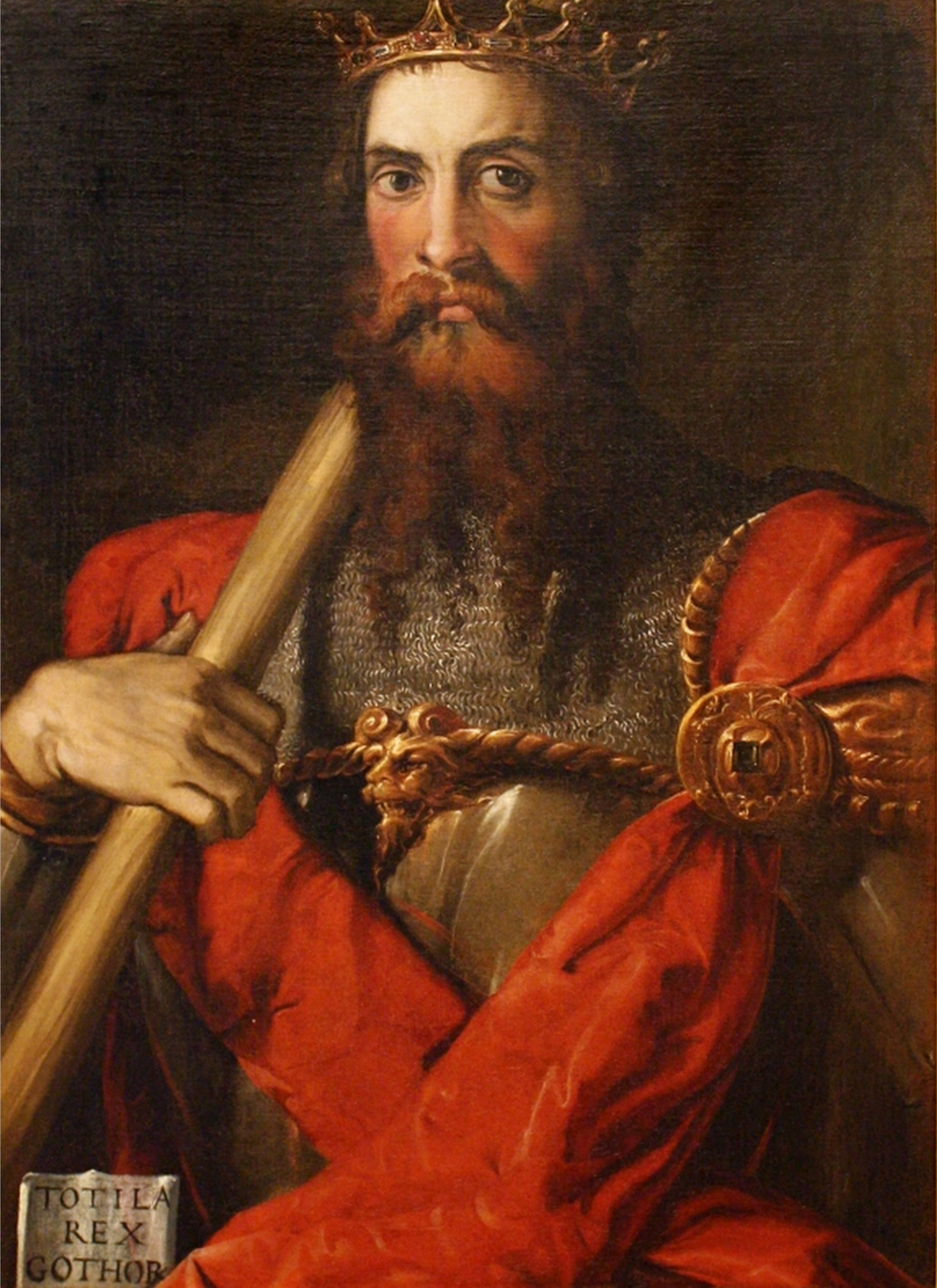
Totila by Francesco Salviati, c. 1549

Totila steadily expanded his control over Italy by combining military success with conciliatory policies toward the Italian population, presenting himself as a liberator from Byzantine exactions. In the meantime, a plague (541–549) weakened the Byzantine Empire's ability to field armies, killing one third of its population. By 544, much of southern and central Italy had fallen under Gothic control, leaving the Byzantines confined to a few fortified cities. Rome, poorly supplied and neglected by imperial authorities, was blockaded and captured by Totila in December 546, following famine and internal betrayal. Although the city was partially depopulated and its defenses deteriorated, Totila refrained from destroying it, seeking to exploit its symbolic value in negotiations. He offered peace to Justinian on moderate terms, proposing recognition of Gothic rule in Italy in exchange for nominal imperial suzerainty; Justinian rejected these overtures. With diplomacy exhausted and Byzantine relief efforts faltering, Totila reoccupied Rome in 549, which had lost control in 547. He consolidated Gothic dominance over most of the Italian Peninsula and Sicily, prolonging the war until the Byzantine counteroffensive of 552 AD.

A third force in the Gothic–Byzantine struggle was the Franks, largely based in Gaul. They sought to expand in northern Italy by exploiting the weakening of the Byzantine and Gothic authorities. They offered limited diplomatic and material support to the Goths while avoiding a formal alliance, aiming to block a lasting Byzantine restoration in Italy. In 538, the Frankish King Theodebert I sent a force of Burgundians to assist the Goths in the capture and destruction of Milan, while claiming to Justinian that they were not under his authority. The following year, a Frankish army invaded northern Italy, attacking the Goths and the Byzantines, but retreated due to disease. During Totila's reign, the Franks found the opportunity to occupy provinces in the Cottian Alps (part of Liguria) and Venetia, since most of the Gothic forces were in the south fighting against the Byzantines. Totila entered into an agreement with the Franks for a provisional occupation of the seized territories, which would become permanent in case of a Gothic victory. After 547 and the loss of Rome to the Byzantines, Totila proposed marriage to an unnamed Merovingian princess, probably a daughter of Theudebert, but the offer was refused on the prediction that he would fail to secure lasting control of Italy. This rejection underscored for Totila the political importance of holding Rome.

== Prelude ==
As early as 549, the Emperor Justinian I planned to dispatch an army to Italy to conclude the war with the Goths. He assigned his cousin, Germanus, to start recruiting an army for this purpose. Germanus's sudden death in 550 resulted in a temporary postponement as Justinian delayed in selecting a replacement for the commander-in-chief for the campaign. During 550–551, an expeditionary force strong enough to remove the Goths from Italy was gradually assembled at Salona in Dalmatia, comprising regular Byzantine units and several contingents of foreign allies, notably Lombards, Heruls, and Bulgars. Justinian appointed his chamberlain (Cubicularius), Narses, to command in mid-551. The reasons for this choice by Justinian were unclear. Narses had limited military experience but he had the strength of character to unify the fractured Byzantine leadership in Italy. Narses avoided crossing the sea to Italy due to the threat posed by the Gothic fleet in the southern Adriatic Sea. The following spring, he led the Byzantine army around the coast of the Adriatic Sea.

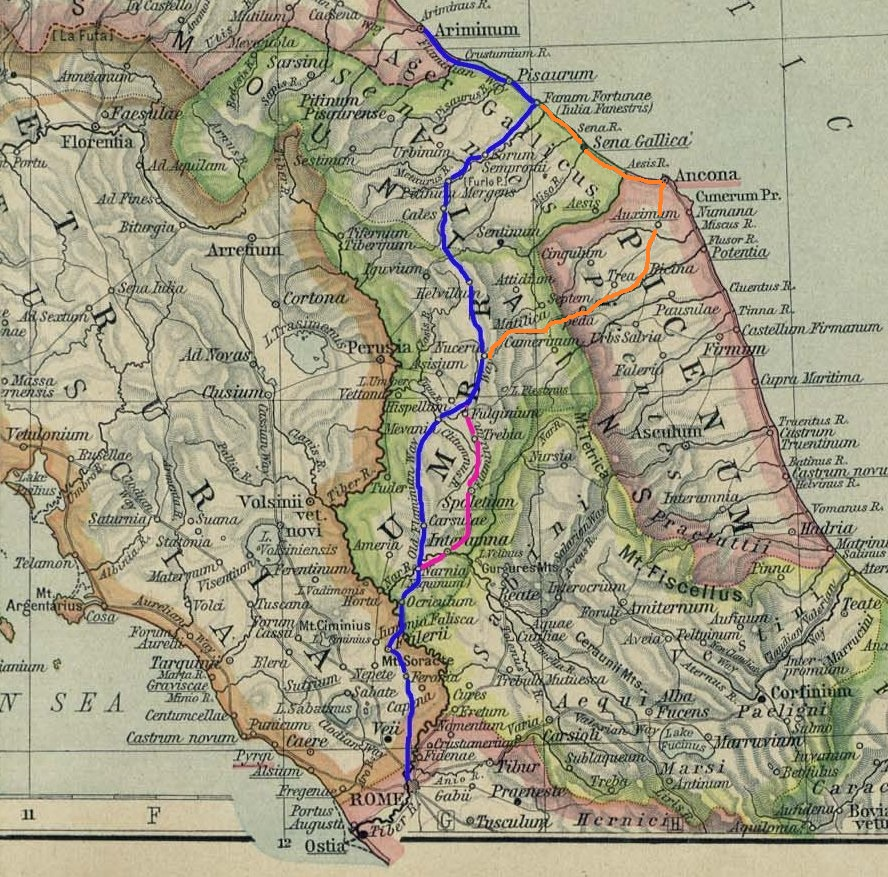
Route of the Via Flaminia; the purple route indicates the Via Flaminia Nova. The orange route indicates the variant that crosses the central part of Marche and reaches the Adriatic Sea in Ancona.

The Franks controlled the land route through Venetia and Narses failed to get permission to pass because the Lombard troops in the Byzantine army were bitter enemies of the Franks. He also faced the threat posed by the Gothic commander Teia, who held Verona. Teia, with the best Gothic troops, hindered a Byzantine crossing of the Po River by positioning himself to strike any attempted passage. To bypass these dangers, Narses adopted a plan proposed by John the Sanguinary, the nephew of consul Vitalian, who knew the region well. The army would march along the sea coast while a fleet sailed alongside, ferrying troops across river mouths as needed. Though slow, this strategy allowed the Byzantine army to reach Ravenna safely.

In the early summer of 552, Narses and his army rested for nine days at Ravenna, and they were joined by the remnants of the Byzantine forces under Valerianus and Justinus. He left Justinus with a garrison there and then advanced toward Ariminum. Narses planned to march directly against the Goths to force a decisive battle with all his forces. When the Gothic commander of Ariminum, Usdrilas, taunted and insulted Narses, he avoided him and continued his path to Rome. The historian J. B. Bury noted that the usual coastal route from Ariminum to Rome through Fanum Fortunae and then along the Via Flaminia was blocked by Gothic control of Petra Pertusa. Narses joined the Via Flaminia west of the gorge of Petra Pertusa, probably near modern Acqualagna, though it is unclear whether he left the coast near Ariminum or Pisaurum.

Totila was facing a dilemma; either he could protect Rome and other strongholds by splitting his forces and thus diminishing the strength of his field army, or he could keep his army together and intercept the Byzantines before they reached Rome. Upon hearing that Narses was at Ravenna, Totila, who was in Rome, chose the latter. He assembled his troops and moved to intercept Narses.

== Military actions ==
=== Deployment ===
In July 552, the Byzantine and Gothic forces encountered each other at Busta Gallorum, a hilly terrain near the village of Taginae, located somewhere to the north of modern Gualdo Tadino. (Note: Ancient Greek: Βουσταγαλλώρων, romanized: Boustagallṓrōn, lit. "Tomb of the Gauls".) Totila pitched his camp at Taginae while waiting for 2,000 soldiers under Teia to arrive. Narses pitched his camp near the Apennine Mountains and about 100 stades, c. 18.4 km (11.4 mi), away from Totila's camp. Narses sent an envoy to Totila, urging him to surrender or name a day for battle. Totila replied that he would fight in eight days. Narses considered this a stratagem for a surprise attack, and instead, he deployed his army in a defensive position, anticipating an immediate engagement.

In the center, Narses massed the Germanic mercenaries, dismounted to avoid the temptation to flee, in a dense formation and placed the Byzantine troops on either side. On each wing, he stationed 4,000 foot-archers, who had a dual purpose. They could serve as foot-archers or adopt a pike/spear phalanx formation. The majority of non-foreign Byzantine troops were placed on the flanks, which were protected by the terrain features, and possibly caltrops. Narses and John took posts on the left and Valerianus on the right wing. He also placed a detachment of 1,500 cavalry at the extreme left behind the hill, with instructions that 500 were to rescue any routed Byzantine units, while the rest were to attack the Gothic infantry's rear once it entered into action.

=== Skirmishes and delays ===
The following day, the two armies drew up facing one another at a distance of about two bowshots. There was a small hill that would provide security from flanking attack to the side that occupied it, and it was accessible only by a narrow path fronted by a watercourse. The Goths attempted to seize it to outflank the Byzantine position, but Narses anticipated the move and occupied the hill with fifty infantrymen. Totila sent a cavalry squadron against them, but they were repelled.

Approximate map of the battle of Taginae; the arrows outline approximate army movements. The Byzantine army was in a defensive position with infantry at the center and archers at the flanks protected by natural terrain. Byzantine cavalry was behind the infantry and a cavalry detachment was placed on the extreme side behind a hill. The Goths formed two lines, the cavalry at the front followed by the infantry. (Note: The map was inspired by the maps found in Syvänne book. Alternative maps have been produced by Bury and John Haldon.)

Having failed to turn Narses's position, and expecting 2,000 reinforcements from Teia, Totila attempted to delay the battle. Totila sent out Coccas, who had deserted from the Byzantines to the Goths, to challenge the Byzantines to a single combat. Coccas was a horseman of great physical strength and rode to the Byzantines within speaking distance to lay the challenge. One of Narses's bodyguards of Armenian origin, named Anzalas, answered the challenge. Coccas charged at Anzalas, aiming his spear at Anzalas's stomach, but at the last moment, Anzalas swerved his horse and stabbed Coccas at his left side. Coccas fell mortally wounded, and triumphant shouts rang from the Byzantine side.

To delay the engagement further, Totila rode to the middle of the battlefield, dressed in shining purple and gold armor. His horse went in circles, reared, pirouetted, and ran backward as Totila tossed and caught his lance in the air. After some time, he rode back to his own army and changed into battle armor. He sent a message to Narses proposing negotiations, but Narses refused. With these delay tactics, the morning passed, but by then the reinforcements under Teia had arrived.

=== Battle ===
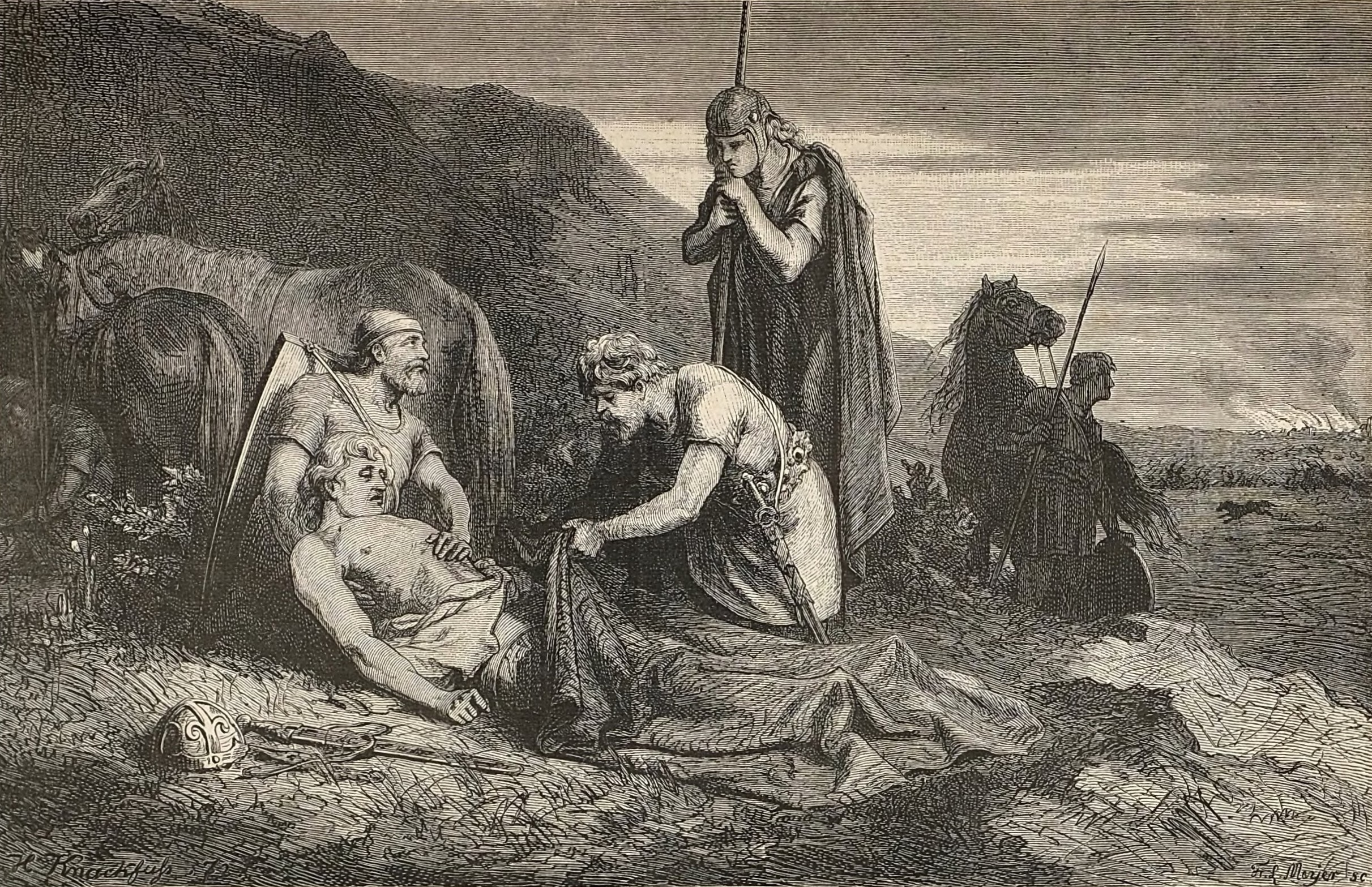
Totila's death after the battle of Taginae by Hermann Knackfuß c. 1871

After his reinforcements arrived, Totila broke formation and retired for lunch, presumably to make the Byzantines relax their guard. Narses, wary of a ruse, permitted his troops to refresh themselves without leaving their positions. When Totila returned to the field, he found the Byzantines ready. He then formed his cavalry into a single body across the front, while placing the infantry in the rear. Totila launched a sudden mounted assault upon the Byzantine center, followed by the Gothic infantry. His strategy appeared to be an attempt to break the Byzantine ranks with a concentrated cavalry charge, with the infantry taking advantage of the lines broken by the cavalry. Totila had given orders to all his troops to use spears over any other weapon.

Narses, anticipating Totila's actions, ordered the two archer detachments to turn half-round to form a crescent, each facing the other, so they could fire arrows from both sides at the Gothic cavalry charge. Caught in enfilade, the Gothic cavalry suffered many casualties, and their attack faltered. The battle at the center was fierce but short-lived. By evening, the Gothic cavalry gave way and started to retreat toward the Gothic infantry, which had not taken part in the fighting. Instead of opening a way for the cavalry to pass and to face the Byzantines, they turned and retreated along with the Gothic cavalry. The retreat became a rout, with the Byzantines pursuing the Goths. Many prisoners were caught but later put to death, resulting in as many as 6,000 slain by nightfall. Among the casualties was Totila, who was mortally wounded. (Note: According to one account provided by Procopius, Totila fled with four or five companions and was pursued by Asbad the Gepid and others who did not recognize him. As Asbad was about to strike, a young Goth cried out, "Dog, will you smite your master?" The Gepid nevertheless drove his spear through Totila, though he was wounded in turn by one of the king's followers. The Goths carried their mortally wounded lord for about seven miles, halting only at Caprae, near Tadinum, where he died and was hastily buried. His death and burial place were later revealed to the Byzantines by a Gothic woman; the body was exhumed and identified, and then buried again. Byzantine chronicler John Malalas supplements this story with Totilas's blood-stained garments and gem-adorned cap being sent to Narses, who forwarded them to Constantinople as proof to the emperor that his long-defiant enemy was dead.)

== Aftermath ==
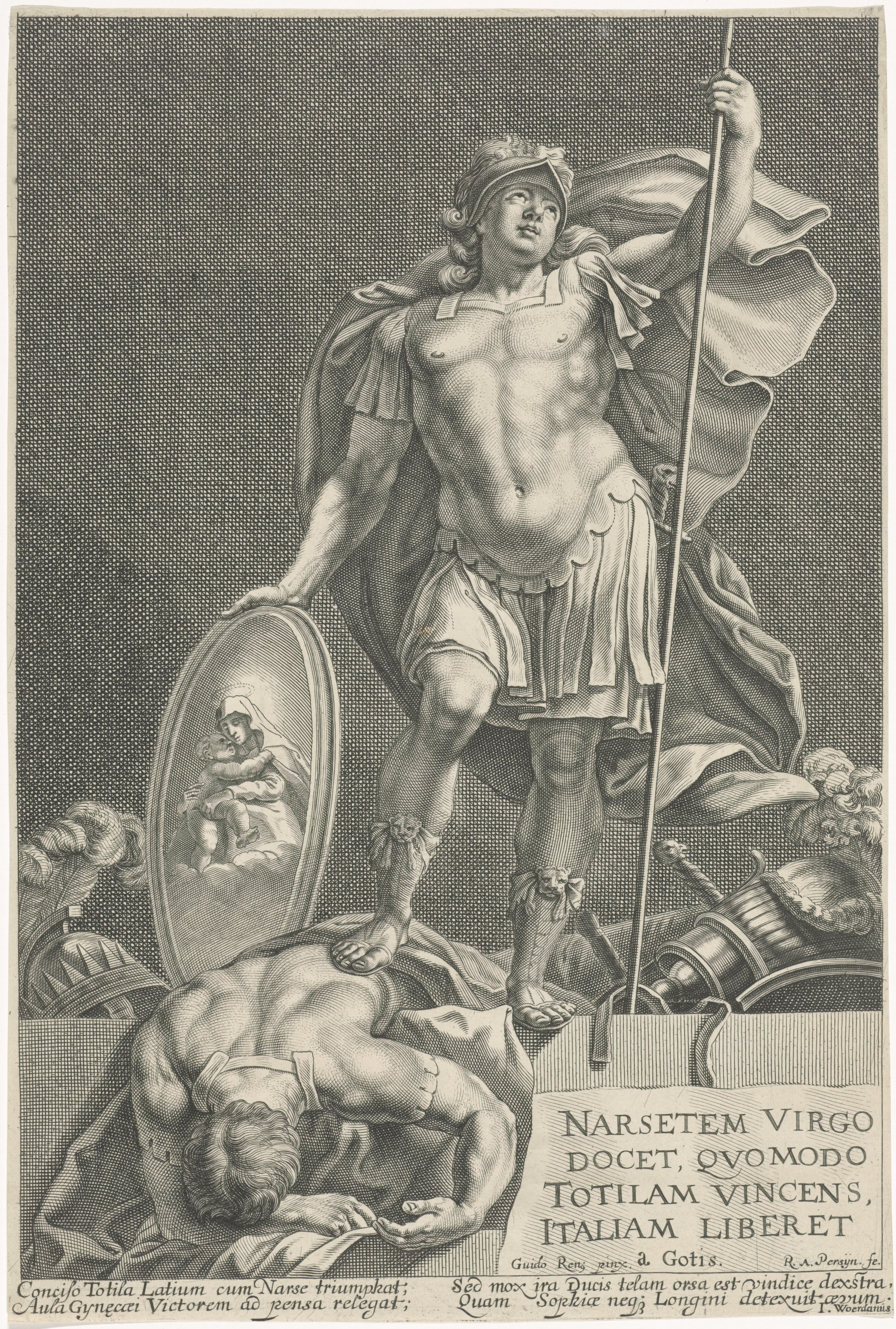
Byzantine general Narses over the defeated King of Ostrogoths Totila by Reinier van Persijn in 1655

Narses attributed his victory to divine favor. Afterward, he dismissed his Lombard allies, whose immediate turn to arson and rape made them intolerable. He paid them generously and entrusted Valerianus with escorting them to the Italian frontier. Once separated from the Lombards, Valerianus encamped outside Verona and opened negotiations with the Gothic garrison, which was willing to surrender. However, the talks collapsed after intervention by the Franks in Venetia. Valerianus then withdrew; Narses ordered him to remain in the region and observe the remaining Gothic forces. The remnants of Totila's army fled north with Teia to Ticinum, where Totila had kept his treasury. Teia was proclaimed king and sought to revive Gothic resistance.

Narses and his troops entered Rome in July 552, and the keys of its gates were delivered to Justinian. In October 552, Teia was defeated and killed at the Battle of Mons Lactarius (near Mount Vesuvius) by a Byzantine army under Narses. The Goths failed to appoint a new king, which exposed the fragility of their remaining power. Narses quickly captured a number of cities that lacked Goth garrisons, including Florence, Centumcellae, Volaterrae, and Pisa. While the Battle of Taginae was not the last Byzantine–Gothic engagement, it was decisive enough to break the capability of the Goths to field a viable army to resist the Byzantine recapture of the Italian Peninsula.

The defeat at Mount Lacarius triggered another request from the Goths north of the River Po to the Franks to intervene. A 75,000-strong Frankish army, under Alamannic dukes Lothar and Buccelin, moved south to Italy in the following year. While the Franks outnumbered the Byzantines, the Byzantines had better supplies and fortifications. In October 554, Narses defeated the Franks in the Battle of Volturno, eliminating them as a threat. The remaining cities in Italy under Gothic control began to fall. Notable examples included Compsa in 555 and Verona in 561.

== Scholarly assessment ==
The military historian Charles Oman placed the Battle of Taginae in his 1898 analysis within the broader development of medieval warfare. He described it as "the first experiment in the combination of pike and bow" and drew parallels with later engagements such as the Battle of Crécy. His interpretation was based on the assumption that in late antiquity, the diminishing role of the infantry was replaced by mounted combat. In Byzantine warfare in particular, the rise of mounted archers was seen as decisive in many of Belisarius's victories. Narses's seemingly atypical use of infantry, i.e., his deployment of dismounted Germanic allies in phalanx formation and archers' crescent formation, and Totila's cavalry charge "with spears only," resulted in repeating Procopius's narrative in early secondary literature of the brilliant "eunuch-general" outsmarting the brave but impetuous "barbarian king".

Modern military scholarship has rejected this interpretation. The historian Philip Rance argued that infantry remained the core of Byzantine armies despite the growing importance of cavalry. He attributed this misconception to the fact that sixth-century warfare produced few decisive pitched battles in which infantry played an obvious tactical role and Procopius's narrative disproportionately emphasized mounted combat, marginalizing infantry actions in battles and sieges. Narses's army deployment reflected long-standing Byzantine military traditions and the tactical realities of late antique warfare. Totila's order to fight "with spears only" demonstrated his recognition that Byzantine archers could best be countered by close-quarters combat and a surprise attack would have further minimized their impact. Rance concluded that Totila had strategically lost the battle before it began, because he was compelled to intercept Narses's numerically superior army before reaching Rome.
