= Arbayistan =

Province of the Sasanian Empire

Arbāyistān
- Province of the Sasanian Empire
- 262–299; 363–638
- Map showing the Roman-Sasanian borders
- Capital: Nisibis
- Historical era: Late Antiquity
  - Established: 262
  - Peace of Acilisene: 363
  - Annexed by the Rashidun Caliphate: 638
| Preceded by | Succeeded by |
| Kingdom of Hatra; Mesopotamia (Roman province) | Diyar Rabi'a |
- Today part of: Iraq; Syria; Turkey

Arbāyistān (Parthian: 𐭀𐭓𐭁𐭉𐭎𐭕𐭍𐭉, romanized: [ʾrby]stny; Middle Persian: Arbāyistān, Arāwastān, Arwāstān; Armenian: Arvastan) or Beth Arabaye (Syriac: Bēṯ ʿArbāyē) was a Sasanian province in Late Antiquity. Due to its situation and its road systems, the province was a source of income from commercial traffic, as well as a constant area of contention during the Roman–Persian Wars.

The province reached across Upper Mesopotamia toward the Khabur and north to the lower districts of Armenia; it bordered Adiabene in the east, Armenia in the north and Asoristan in the south. On the west, it bordered the Roman provinces of Osroene and Mesopotamia. The principal city of the Arbayistan province was Nisibis and it also included the fortress of Sisauranon.

== Name ==
Arbāyistān (from Old Persian Arabāya-stāna) is mentioned in Shapur I's inscription at the Ka'ba-ye Zartosht. The terms Arbāyistān and Syriac Beth ʿArbaye literally mean "land of the Arabs", using the suffix -istān ("land") and the word beth ("house"), respectively. The Romans called it Arabia. According to historian Geo Widengren, the name refers to the Arab inhabitants of Upper Mesopotamia.

== History ==
=== Early history ===
Arbayistan is first attested as a province in the Ka'ba-ye Zartosht inscription of the second Sasanian King of Kings (shahanshah) Shapur I (r. 240–270), which was erected in c. 262. The province was lost after Peace of Nisibis (299), when Narseh ceded northern Mesopotamia to the Romans. This included the former Armenian provinces of Corduene, Zabdicene, Arzanene and Moxoene as well as Nisibis and Singara. It was restored in 363 after the 2nd Peace of Nisibis, composed of the concessions made by Roman Emperor Jovian, which encompassed all Roman territory east of the Tigris that had been ceded by the Sasanians in the 1st Peace of Nisibis in 299. As part of the treaty, the Romans were allowed to evacuate the inhabitants of the cities of Nisibis and Singara, and this led to the mass exodus of the entire populations of both cities to Roman territories to avoid imprisonment and deportation by the Sasanians. This also caused the Christian School of Nisibis to move to Edessa. In the 360s, Shapur II divided the office of marzban between his brothers Zamasp and Adurfrazgird and they were granted responsibility for the northern and southern halves of the province respectively.

As a result of the Peace of Acilisene of 387, Armenia was divided between the Eastern Roman and Sasanian Empires and the majority of Arzanene was given to the Romans, aside from the canton of Arzan itself. In the fourth century, 12,000 Persians from Istakhr, Spahan and other regions were settled in Nisibis to act as mainly military garrisons. At the close of the fourth century, in 395, the Huns breached the Caspian Gates and swarmed through the east, plundering Armenia and Eastern Roman Cappadocia, Cilicia and Syria undisturbed until moving to raid Sasanian Arbayistan in 398.

During the Roman–Sasanian War of 421–422, the magister militum per Orientem, Ardaburius, invaded and plundered Arzanene in 421. Ardaburius engaged and defeated the Sasanian grand vizier, Mihr Narseh, and with reinforcements besieged Nisibis. The army of Al-Mundhir I, an ally of the Sasanians, who had been sent to relieve Nisibis, was defeated by Ardaburius beneath the walls and dispersed. Ardaburius' victory over Al-Mundhir I led the new Shah, Bahram V, to end his siege of Theodosiopolis and march to relieve Nisibis, causing the Romans to abandon the siege.

=== Middle History ===
From 464 to 471, a famine struck Mesopotamia which devastated the crops and ruined the country. Sources say that the wells became dry and that there was not a trickle of water either in the Tigris or the Euphrates. Eventually the crops failed and thousands perished. In 483, a severe drought affected the region and lasted for two years, during which time tensions between the Romans and Persians heightened as Arab nomads allied to the Persians raided Roman territory, causing the Romans to assemble an army on the frontier to counter such raids. The situation was defused, however, by the marzban of Nisibis and Nestorian metropolitan bishop of Nisibis, Barsauma. Three years into the reign of Kavad I (r. 488–496, 498/9–531), in 491, an uprising in Armenia encouraged the Qadishaye tribesmen south of Singara to revolt and besiege Nisibis.

At the time of the Anastasian War, Kavad I besieged and sacked the city of Amida in 503, and resettled the population in Singara. The loss of Amida spurred the Roman emperor Anastasius I Dicorus to send reinforcements to the Persian border, however, a Roman army that crossed over into Arzanene was defeated. In the spring of 504, the Roman general Celer invaded Arbayistan and conducted raids against fortified settlements, seizing several forts and plundering the province, killing farmers and livestock alike.

In the mid-summer of 527, at the onset of the Iberian War and as overt fighting broke out between the Romans and Sasanians, a Roman army under the command of Libelarius of Thrace, dux Mesopotamiae and magister militum per Orientem, invaded Arbayistan with the intent of capturing Nisibis and the fortress of Thebetha. Libelarius, however, refrained from engaging the Sasanians or looting and despite facing no opposition, withdrew to Dara with heavy losses having achieved nothing, and upon his return was replaced as magister militum per orientum by Belisarius. Towards the end of the war, in 531, Belisarius led an army into Arbayistan. Unable to capture Nisibis, he besieged Sisauranon. He was almost defeated in the assault, but the garrison under Bleschames eventually agreed to defect due to lack of supplies.

As part of the state implemented persecution of non-Chalcedonian Christians, in late 536, the Patriarch of Antioch, Ephraim of Antioch, bribed the marzban of Nisibis, Mihrdaden, to arrest John of Tella who had been residing on Mount Singara. John was arrested and held in Nisibis for 30 days under the accusation of living in Sasanian territory illegally and was handed over to the Romans at the border fortress of Dara. Upon the invasion of Roman Syria in 540 by Khosrow I, Belisarius was recalled from Italy to respond to the Sasanian threat. He arrived in Mesopotamia in 541 and besieged Nisibis, however Belisarius could not take the city and subsequently plundered the surrounding countryside. The following year, Khosrow returned from Lazica and invaded Roman Syria; during his invasion Khosrow sacked Callinicum and resettled prisoners in Arbayistan.

=== Late History ===
Map of northern Mesopotamia and its surroundings under the late Sasanians

At the beginning of the Byzantine–Sasanian War of 572–591, in late 572, a small Byzantine army of 3000 infantrymen were dispatched by Marcian, magister militum per orientum, to Arzanene where they laid waste and plundered the region before returning to Dara. In the spring of 573, a Byzantine army under the command of Marcian departed from Dara and defeated a Persian army led by Baramanes at the town of Sagathon, west of Nisibis, and moved south to besiege the fortress of Thebetha, however, Marcian returned to Dara after spending 10 days besieging the fort without success. Marcian, under orders from the Byzantine Emperor Justin II, besieged the city of Nisibis until he was dismissed by Justin II as he felt he was taking too long to take the city. The majority of Byzantine soldiers returned to Dara, and a body of soldiers that remained at the camp were defeated by a Persian army.

Khosrow I's conquest of the city of Dara later that year reportedly drove Justin II to insanity, and led to a declaration of a truce on the Mesopotamian front which was to last 5 years. The truce came to an end in 578 when Sasanian raids in Byzantine territory was met by Byzantine raids in Arbayistan led by the new magister militum per orientum, Maurice, who also sacked Singara, and according to historian Theophylact Simocatta, liberated 10,090 Armenian prisoners in Arzanene, of whom about 3,350 were relocated to Cyprus. He also captured the fortress of Aphumon. Sasanian attempts to sue for peace after Maurice's campaign in Arbayistan in 579 failed and the following year, the Byzantine armies successfully marched through Arbayistan unopposed into Media and Assuristan before returning in the summer of 581 along the Euphrates in southern Arbayistan, sacking Anathon during their campaign.

Byzantine raids and Sasanian counter-raids continued for the next eight years inconclusively until the Byzantine general, Philippicus, invaded Arzanene and besieged the fortress of Chlomaron in spring of 586. However, the approach of a Persian relief army panicked the Byzantines, who fled in disorder back into Byzantine territory. In the autumn of 589, a Byzantine army under Comentiolus won a battle at the fortress of Sisauranon. At the end of the war, Corduene, Aghdzen canton and Zabdicene was annexed by the Byzantine Empire in return for assisting Khosrow II regain the throne from the usurper, Bahram Chobin. The city of Nisibis was one of the first to support Khosrow and a joint Byzantine-Sasanian campaign defeated an army of Bahram near Nisibis in early 591.

Not long after the end of the Byzantine–Sasanian War of 572–591, a locust plague ravaged the countryside of the province from 591 to 595, in which locusts are said to have destroyed crops and fouled water supplies. The ensuing food shortages and famine caused many to migrate to neighbouring regions, whilst those less able were forced to resort to begging in nearby cities. This led to the abandonment of many villages and hamlets throughout Arbayistan. Some survived the plague by collecting and eating the locusts or by planting "small vegetables" such as summer peas and cucumbers.

Upon the end of the Byzantine–Sasanian War of 602–628, Heraclius travelled through Arbayistan as part of the agreed withdrawal from Sasanian territory. A pretender to the Sasanian throne, Hormizd VI, briefly occupied Nisibis from 630 to 632. After the Muslim victory at the Battle of Jalula in April 637, Muslim forces marched north and established control over Sasanian Upper Mesopotamia, and annexed Arbayistan in 638.

== Economy ==
Arbayistan's position on the Silk Road provided the province with a large income derived from custom-houses along the roads as well as from traffic on the rivers. The goods that came with it: silks and spices from the Indian and Arabian sea-trade assembled at Nisibis before it was sold to Roman merchants. The silk trade, which supplied the weaving industry of Syria, was especially lucrative and continued to thrive despite the threat of Arab raids along the roads.

The Sasanian control of the two major East-West highways and excellent road system made the province easily accessible for trade.

== Population ==
The population of Arbayistan was primarily composed of Arameans, who spoke the Aramaic language, and shared the province with Arabs, such as the Tanukhids, Jews, Armenians and Iranian peoples. Arabs lived as both nomads and sedentary groups throughout the province, they have thrived in cities like the city of Hatra further south. Armenians could be found largely in the north of Arbayistan, in the districts of Arzanene, whilst Iranian tribes lived in the north-eastern districts of Corduene.

== See also ==
- Kingdom of Hatra

== Bibliography ==
- Blockley, R.C. (1984). "The Romano-Persian Peace Treaties of A.D. 299 and 363". Florilegium. 6 (6): 28–49. doi:10.3138/flor.6.002.
- Brunner, C. J. (1983a). "ĀDURFRĀZGIRD". Encyclopaedia Iranica. p. 478.
- Brunner, Christopher (1983b). "Geographical and Administrative divisions: Settlements and Economy". The Cambridge History of Iran: The Seleucid, Parthian, and Sasanian periods (2). Cambridge University Press. ISBN 9780521200936.
- Bury, J. B. (1889). A History of the Later Roman Empire from Arcadius to Irene, Vol. 1.
- Cohen, Robin (2008). Global Diasporas: An Introduction. Taylor & Francis. ISBN 9780203928943.
- Crawford, Peter (2016). Constantius II: Usurpers, Eunuchs, and the Antichrist. Pen & Sword.
- Dignas, Beate; Winter, Engelbert (2007). Rome and Persia in Late Antiquity: Neighbours and Rivals. Cambridge University Press. ISBN 9780521849258.
- Edwards, Iorwerth Eiddon Stephen; Bowman, Alan; Garnsey, Peter; Cameron, Averil (1970). The Cambridge Ancient History: Volume 12, The Crisis of Empire, AD 193-337. Cambridge University Press. ISBN 978-0-521-30199-2.
- Evans, James Allan (2002). The Age of Justinian: The Circumstances of Imperial Power. Routledge. ISBN 9781134559763.
- Evans, James Allan (2011). The Power Game in Byzantium: Antonina and the Empress Theodora. Bloomsbury. ISBN 9781441172525.
- Farrokh, Kaveh; Frye, Richard N. (2007). Shadows in the Desert: Ancient Persia at War.
- Foord, E.A. (1911). The Byzantine Empire. Рипол Классик. p. 87.
- Frye, Richard N. (1983). The History of Ancient Iran.
- Greatrex, Geoffrey (1993). "The two fifth-century Wars between Rome and Persia". Florilegium. 12 (12): 1–14. doi:10.3138/flor.12.001.
- Greatrex, Geoffrey (1999). "The Hunnic Invasion of the East of 395 and the fortress of Ziatha". Byzantion: Revue Internationale des Études Byzantines (69).
- Greatrex, Geoffrey; Lieu, Samuel N. C. (2005). The Roman Eastern Frontier and the Persian Wars AD 363-628. Routledge. ISBN 9781134756452.
- Greatrex, Geoffrey (2007). "Roman frontiers and foreign policy in the East". Aspects of the Roman East. Volume I. Studia Antiqua Australiensia. Vol. 3. pp. 103–173. doi:10.1484/M.SAA-EB.4.00061. ISBN 978-2-503-52625-6.
- Harrak, Amir (2011). "Beth ʿArbaye". In Sebastian P. Brock; Aaron M. Butts; George A. Kiraz; Lucas Van Rompay (eds.). Gorgias Encyclopedic Dictionary of the Syriac Heritage. Gorgias Press, electronic edition by Beth Mardutho.
- Joshua the Stylite (1882). W. Jones, ed. Chronicle
- Jullien, Christelle (2018). "Beth 'Arabaye". In Nicholson, Oliver (ed.). The Oxford Dictionary of Late Antiquity. Oxford: Oxford University Press. ISBN 978-0-19-866277-8.
- Maksymiuk, Katarzyna (2015). "Geography of Roman-Iranian wars. Military operations of Rome and Sasanian Iran". Historia I Świat. 5: 283.
- Martindale, John Robert; Jones, Arnold Hugh Martin; Morris, J., eds. (1992). The Prosopography of the Later Roman Empire, Volume III: A.D. 527–641. Cambridge University Press. ISBN 9780521201605.
- Morony, Michael (2006). "IRAQ i. IN THE LATE SASANID AND EARLY ISLAMIC ERAS". Encyclopaedia Iranica.
- Rapp, Stephen H. (2014). The Sasanian World through Georgian Eyes: Caucasia and the Iranian Commonwealth in Late Antique Georgian Literature. Ashgate Publishing, Ltd. ISBN 978-1472425522.
- Scullard, Howard Hayes; et al. (2015). "Ancient Rome". Encyclopaedia Britannica.
- Shahbazi, A. Shapur (2004). "Hormozd V". Encyclopaedia Iranica, Vol. XII, Fasc. 5. pp. 467–469.
- Stachowski, Marek (2008). "Studia Etymologica Cracoviensia" (PDF) (in Polish). Jagiellonian University. Archived from the original (PDF) on 2018-09-17.
- Whitby, Michael (1988). The Emperor Maurice and his Historian – Theophylact Simocatta on Persian and Balkan Warfare. Clarendon Press. ISBN 9780198229452.
- Widengren, G. (1986). "ARBĀYISTĀN". Encyclopaedia Iranica. pp. 276–277.
- Watt, J. W.; Trombley, Frank R. (2000). The Chronicle of Pseudo-Joshua the Stylite. Liverpool University Press. ISBN 9780853235859.
- Young, George Frederick (1916). East and West Through Fifteen Centuries: Being a General History from B.C. 44 to A.D. 1453, Vol.II.
