= Coccas =

Coccas may refer to:

- Coccas, a deserter from the Eastern Roman Empire to the Ostrogoths in the Gothic War (535–554)
- Coccas, a type of ship
