= Mesopotamian campaign of Belisarius (541-542) =

- Part of the Lazic War
- Roman-Sassanian frontier in the 6th century
Date	Summer 541
Location	Mesopotamia
Result	Byzantine victory
Territorial changes	Capture and destruction of Sisauranon; Failure to capture Nisibis; Raid conducted across the Tigris river; Withdrawal of Belisarius' army

Belligerents
Byzantine Empire; Goths; Ghassanids	Sasanian Empire

Commanders and leaders
Belisarius; Bouzes; Al-Harith ibn Jabalah	Khosrow I Nabedes; Bleschames

Strength
For the 541 campaign: Army of the East, Army of Armenia and Ghassanid Arab allies For the 542 campaign: Possibly at least 6,000 men (according to Procopius)	Possibly more men (in 542)

In 541, General Belisarius of the Byzantine Empire led a counter-offensive in Persian territory into Mesopotamia, as part of a counter-offensive against the Persian King Khosrow I's prior invasion of the Roman East in 540. Upon his arrival in the East, Belisarius quickly instilled order in his army and joined Buzes and the Army of Armenia. After a failed engagement at Nisibis, Belisarius moved past the well-fortified city but managed to capture and destroy the walled town of Sisauranon. Belisarius then proceeded to dispatch his Ghassanid Arab allies to conduct a successful raid on Persian lands across the Tigris. Due to the Persians' unpreparedness in Mesopotamia, Buzes wanted to press on with the invasion and attack Ctesiphon, but Belisarius refused due to his lack of confidence in his army.

== Background ==
In 532, the Byzantine Empire and the Sasanian Empire had signed the Eternal Peace, which was meant to permanently settle the ongoing conflicts along their shared frontier. However, Emperor Justinian I subsequently launched massive western reconquests under his premier general, Belisarius, successfully overthrowing the Vandals in North Africa and capturing the Ostrogothic capital of Ravenna in Italy.

Exploiting the fact that the bulk of the Byzantine forces were still committed in the West, Shah Khosrow I broke the treaty in 540, launching a devastating invasion into the Roman East, culminating in a brutal siege of Antioch, one of the empire's wealthiest cities.

In response to the invasion of Syria, Justinian recalled Belisarius from Italy to handle the crisis on the eastern frontier. Appointed once again as the magister militum of the East, Belisarius arrived in Upper Mesopotamia in early 541, Seeing that Khosrow had marched far north to campaign against the Byzantines in Lazica (the Lazic War), Belisarius resolved to launching a swift counter-offensive directly into Sassanian territory to relieve pressure on the Roman borders and draw the Persian shah away from the north.

== Mesopotamian campaign ==
=== Assembly and the Advance on Nisibis ===
Upon his arrival on the eastern frontier in early 541, Belisarius established his headquarters at the fortified base of Dara. He found the local Roman forces demoralized, disorganized, and terrified of the Sasanians following the catastrophic events of the previous year. Belisarius immediately initiated rigorous military drills to restore discipline and unified his command with regional forces under the general Bouzes and the Army of Armenia.

Learning that the Sasanian King Khosrow I was heavily engaged campaigning in northern Lazica, Belisarius ordered a swift advance across the frontier toward Nisibis, a vital and heavily fortified Persian stronghold. Belisarius positioned his camp approximately five miles away, hoping to draw the garrison out into open combat. The Sasanian commander, Nabedes, deployed a strong defensive force outside the city gates.

Belisarius ordered his commanders to remain on high alert and avoid premature engagements. However, a subordinate commander named Peter disregarded these explicit instructions. Belisarius had warned Peter that the Persians would strike during the midday heat when the Romans typically let down their guard. Ignoring this advice, Peter permitted his men to disperse and eat lunch. Spotting the lapse in discipline, the Sasanian garrison launched a sudden, aggressive sally. Peter's units were utterly routed, losing their military standards and sustaining 50 casualties. Belisarius rushed forward with the main army to stabilize the front and drove the Persians back behind their city walls, but the tactical element of surprise was lost.

=== Siege of Sisauranon ===
Realizing that a direct assault on the formidable fortifications of Nisibis would result in unacceptable losses, Belisarius made the strategic decision to bypass the city and march deeper into Sasanian territory. He advanced toward Sisauranon, a crucial frontier fortress town garrisoned by an elite Sasanian cavalry force under the commander Bleschames.

Belisarius initially attempted a direct assault on the fortress walls, but the Roman troops were repulsed with considerable casualties. Recognizing the strength of the defenses, he altered his strategy to a strict, enveloping blockade to starve the defenders out. To prevent the garrison at Nisibis from marching out to break his siege, Belisarius posted a blocking force under the generals George and John the Glutton to keep watch on the roads behind him.

While the siege lines held, Belisarius dispatched his Ghassanid Arab allies, led by the phylarch Al-Harith ibn Jabalah (Arethas), along with 1,200 Roman regulars, to cross the Tigris River. Their mission was to conduct deep raids into Assyria, looting the un-ravaged Persian heartland and gathering intelligence.

Shortly thereafter, Byzantine scouts captured Sasanian messengers trying to slip out of Sisauranon. Under interrogation, the messengers revealed that the fortress was entirely out of food, water, and vital military supplies. Armed with this critical information, Belisarius negotiated a bloodless surrender with Bleschames. The fortress walls were systematically dismantled, and the 800 captured Sasanian horsemen were spared, defecting to the Roman side before being shipped across the Mediterranean to reinforce the ongoing Byzantine war effort in Italy.

=== Logistical Breakdown and Withdrawal ===
Despite the successful capture of Sisauranon and urgent pleas from commanders like Bouzes to press the invasion further toward the Sasanian capital of Ctesiphon, the campaign quickly began to unravel due to severe logistical and environmental bottlenecks.

The intense summer heat of the Mesopotamian plains proved catastrophic for the Byzantine army. Troops from cooler northern climates, particularly the Roman units from the Balkans and Thrace, succumbed to widespread, debilitating sickness. The illness became so pervasive that nearly all available transport carts had to be repurposed just to carry the sick and dying soldiers, which were estimated at 1/3 of the total number of men.

Simultaneously, Al-Harith and his Ghassanid raiding party across the Tigris completely stopped communicating with Belisarius. Having amassed a massive amount of plunder from their raiding expedition into Persian territory, Al-Harith intentionally avoided returning to the main camp to prevent Roman commanders from confiscating or having a share in his wealth. He sent secret scouts to warn his men to slip away back to their homeland via an alternative route.

Belisarius found himself deep in hostile territory with a weakened army, missing a vital cavalry faction, and blind to any Sasanian counter-movements. Fearing that Khosrow I would suddenly abandon his northern campaign and trap the weakened Roman forces in an encirclement, Belisarius ordered a full, orderly retreat back into Byzantine territory, bringing the 541 offensive to an end.

== Aftermath ==
Following the strategic withdrawal of Byzantine forces in late 541, the region remained highly unstable. While the campaign failed to secure territorial expansion like Nisibis, it successfully disrupted Sasanian offensive momentum for the year.

In response to another Persian invasion in 542, Belisarius took 6,000 of his best men with hunting equipment with him. In the eyes of the possibly larger Persian force, it looked like a small hunting party which would later result into baiting the Sasanian army into thinking a larger Roman army was behind the smaller Roman force.

The Persians were fooled by the ruse and they retreated, not wanting to face the ongoing plague as well as a possibly larger Roman force within Roman territory.

According to Procopius, Belisarius' accomplishments in the East had earned him greater glory than his victories in Italy and Africa.

== See also ==
- Roman-Persian Wars
- Iberian War
- Lazic War
