= Valaris =

Gothic soldier killed in a duel

Valaris Issues A Challenge To Personal Combat (1996) by Angus McBride

Valaris (Greek: Οὐάλαρις, died 542) was a Gothic soldier who fought for the Ostrogoths against the Eastern Roman Empire in the Gothic War.

Valaris was part of Totila's army engaged at the Battle of Faventia. Before the battle, Valaris approached the Romans on his horse and challenged any of them to do single combat with him. Procopius (Gothic War, III.4.21–29) describes Valaris as a man of great physical size and martial skill. His martial appearance terrified the Roman soldiers, and only a Persarmenian officer named Artabazes stood forth to accept the challenge.

The duel was conducted on horseback, and Artabazes was able to hit Valaris on his right side with his spear, mortally wounding him. Valaris did not fall, however, being buttressed by his spear that was braced against a rock. While Artabazes was pushing his spear into his enemy trying to finish him off, Valaris' spear, standing almost upright, cut Artabazes' neck. Although the wound was not immediately fatal, it caused a great outpour of blood, which could not be halted. Valaris died on the spot, and Artabazes succumbed to the wound three days later. While Artabazes was nurturing his wound in the rear, however, the Battle of Faventia resulted in a great victory for Totila's Ostrogoths.

== See also ==
- Coccas
- Anzalas

== Sources ==
- Amory, Patrick (2003). People and Identity in Ostrogothic Italy, 489-554. Cambridge University Press. ISBN 0521526353.
- Dewing, Henry Bronson, ed. (1962) [1924]. Procopius, with an English translation by H.B. Dewing, in Seven Volumes. Vol. IV: History of the Wars, Books VI [continued] and VII. The Loeb Classical Library. William Heinemann Ltd. (London) & Harvard University Press (Cambridge, Mass.).
