= Siege of Verona =

541 siege during the Gothic War

- Part of the Gothic War (535-554)
- Main army movements during the second phase of the Gothic War
| Date | 541 AD |
| Location | Verona, Italy |
| Result | Ostrogothic victory |

Belligerents
| Byzantine Empire | Ostrogothic Kingdom |

Commanders and leaders
| Constantinianus; Alexander | Unknown |

Strength
| 12,000 | Unknown |

The siege of Verona in the winter of 541 AD was an engagement during the Gothic War (535–554), where the Ostrogoths (Goths) repelled the besieging Byzantine forces.

Byzantine Emperor Justinian compelled his commanders in Italy to take the initiative in the war against the Goths. After some deliberation, they sent a 12,000-strong army to take Verona, one of the last bastions of the Goths. The Byzantines sent a small detachment to secure the entrance since an insider had opened the city gate for them. The Gothic garrison panicked and moved out of the city. Quarrels over the distribution of the expected booty delayed the main Byzantine army's advance. The Goth defenders exploited the confusion, regained control of the city at dawn and forced the small Byzantine force, which had entered the previous night, to flee by jumping from the city walls. When the main Byzantine force arrived early in the morning, they found the gates closed and its commander chose to withdraw. The Byzantines were pursued by the Gothic King Totila, and they were defeated at the Battle of Faventia, marking the beginning of the Gothic recovery of the Italian peninsula from Byzantine control.

== Background ==
Following the fall of Ravenna in May 540 AD, the capital of the Gothic kingdom, Belisarius had succeeded in restoring former Western Roman territories (Sicily and most of the Italian Peninsula) to Byzantine rule. However, his stratagem of inducing the Goths to surrender by offering him the Western Roman imperial crown had spooked Byzantine Emperor Justinian. Although Belisarius returned to Constantinople in mid-summer 540 with Ravenna's treasury and the defeated Gothic King Vitiges as prisoner, Justinian refused him a triumph. The general's departure was also needed on the eastern front against the Persians in the upcoming Lazic War (541–562).

Justinian replaced Belisarius with three commanders of equal authority—Bessas, John the Sanguinary, and Constantinianus. The three commanders fell into rivalry and turned to plundering the Italian population instead of fighting the remaining Goths. The situation deteriorated further when Justinian imposed a severe tax audit, compelling Italians to pay alleged arrears dating from Gothic rule, while simultaneously reducing soldiers' rewards for wounds and acts of bravery. This climate of lawlessness undermined discipline, alienated the troops, and rapidly destroyed Italian loyalty to the empire.

Belisarius's withdrawal from Italy also encouraged the newly crowned Gothic king, Ildibad, whose cause was strengthened by Byzantine abuses. A Byzantine army was defeated at Treviso by Ildibad, enabling the Goths to regain control of much of the Po Valley. His success, however, was short-lived, as he was assassinated before he could consolidate power. Unable to agree on a suitable candidate from among themselves, the Goths accepted Eraric, who belonged to a tribe distinct from the Goths, as their ruler. Eraric convened a council and secured Gothic approval to send an embassy to Constantinople to negotiate peace on the same terms previously offered to Vitigis before the fall of Ravenna. Privately, however, he dispatched his own agents and instructed them to inform Justinian that, in exchange for the rank of patrician and a substantial payment, he would abdicate and surrender northern Italy to the empire. In late 541, Eraric was assassinated by the Gothic nobility for his willingness to surrender to the Byzantines, and Ildibad's nephew, Totila, succeeded him as king.

== Prelude ==
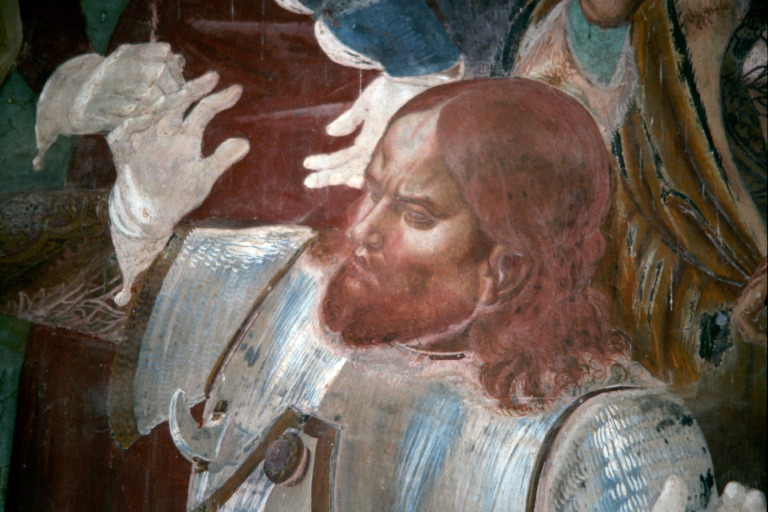
Totila, King of the Ostrogoths, as portrayed by Luca Signorelli

Following the murder of the Gothic King Eraric, Justinian realized that the Goths were paralyzed by internal dissensions and his Byzantine commanders stationed in Italy had not done anything to take advantage of the situation. He sent a letter reprimanding them for their inactivity and demanded action. The Byzantine commanders John, Bessas and Cyprian gathered in Ravenna to debate their course of action. The Byzantine commanders decided to send a 12,000-strong army to take Verona. The army had eleven commanders, with two at the top of the command, Constantinianus and Alexander. While Constantinianus was the de facto commander-in-chief, he lacked the skill and authority to compel the other commanders to follow his commands.

== Siege ==
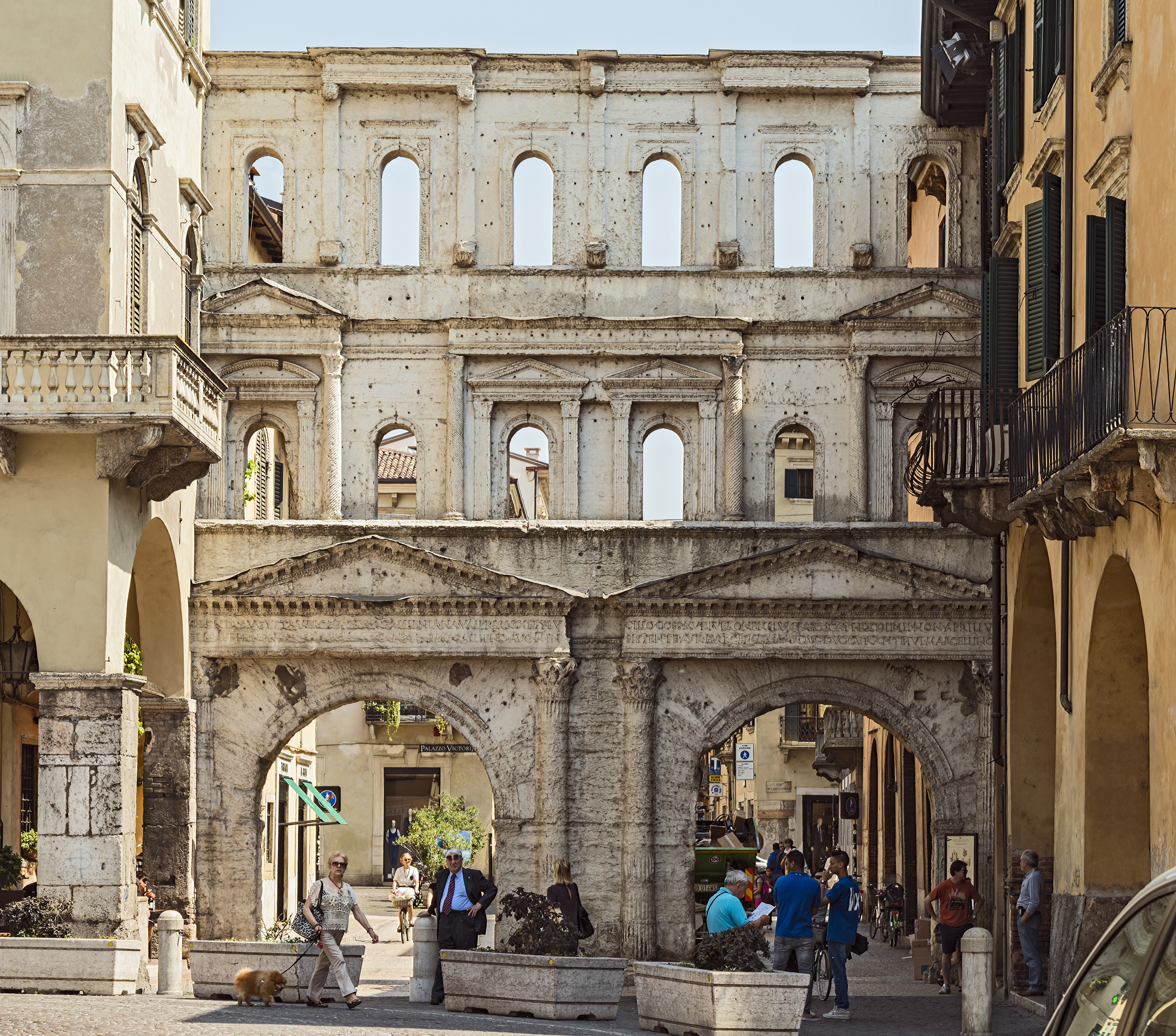
Porta Borsari, an archway at the end of Corso Porta Borsari. This is the façade of a 3rd-century gate in the original Roman city walls.

The Byzantines managed to bribe or otherwise win over Marcianus, one of the city's guards. He was to open a city gate at night so that a small Byzantine unit would seize the gate and prepare the entry for the rest of the army. Artabazes was chosen to lead the operation, and his unit for the night consisted of 100 hand-picked men. (Note: The force that took over the gate was the Persian garrison of Sisauranon under their Persarmenian commander Artabazes that had recently joined the Byzantines after the Siege of Sisauranon (541).) The small force entered the city and took control of the gate and the wall on both sides after killing the Gothic guards. The remaining Goths panicked and fled outside the city to a hill overlooking the city and remained there through the night.

The rest of the Byzantine army failed to arrive on time because the co-commanders were allegedly involved in a nightly dispute over how to divide the plunder once the city was taken. The delay proved disastrous. By dawn, the Gothic garrison had time to organize itself and assess the situation. They advanced against the Byzantine detachment through the city gate, which was still open, leaving the Byzantine soldiers trapped within the city. The subsequent fighting was unusual, as the Byzantine men had to resist an attack from inside the city. Byzantine troops retreated towards the battlements. The main Byzantine army arrived, but it found the city gates closed with Goths in control of the city. Artabazes begged them not to abandon them, but the main army ignored his pleas and started to withdraw. The only way of escape for the trapped Byzantine soldiers was to jump down from the city walls. They did so, with several of them killed by the fall.

== Aftermath ==
The Byzantine army retreated towards Faventia and eventually camped next to a stream variously known as Anemo or Lamone. When the news reached Totila, he pursued with about 5,000 men and defeated them at the Battle of Faventia and then in Battle of Mucellium. Totila went on to seize Caesena and Petra Pertusa in the region of Umbria. Tuscany remained under Byzantine control. Totila did not attempt the conquest of central Italy where the Byzantines controlled large well-fortified cities. Instead, he advanced rapidly through southern Italy with great success, including the capture of the fortress of Cumae.

The Byzantine generals and the remaining troops fled to isolated strongholds (Bessas to Spoleto, Justin back to Florence, Cyprian to Perugia, and John to Rome), where they made preparations against a siege as they did not want to meet the Goths in the open. For the following two years (542–544), they failed to coordinate their efforts against the Goths leading to the prolongation of the war. (Note: The historian, Ian Hughes, argued that a contributing factor to the fractured Byzantine leadership was the 542 plague on the Italian Peninsula, while the commanders remained in place to avoid catching the plague.) In response to the setbacks in Italy, Justinian sent the civilian Maximin to be Praetorian Prefect of Italy, but Maximin's indecision left him unable to formulate a course of action against the Goths. As a result, Totila captured Naples and razed its walls. He advanced to besiege Rome in spring 544. Upon receiving this news, Justinian recalled general Belisarius from the eastern front, where he commanded a Byzantine force against Persia and dispatched him to Italy.

== Sources ==
=== Primary ===
- Procopius (1924). Procopius, The History of Wars. Translated by Dewing, Henry B. London S. Heinemann. OCLC 491843455.

=== Secondary ===
- Bury, John Bagnell (1958). History of the Later Roman Empire: From the Death of Theodosius I to the Death of Justinian. Vol. 2. Mineola, New York: Dover Publications, Inc. OCLC 1046522911.
- Heather, Peter J. (2013). The Restoration of Rome: Barbarian Popes and Imperial Pretenders. Oxford University Press. ISBN 978-0-199-36851-8.
- —————— (2018). Rome Resurgent: War and Empire in the Age of Justinian. Oxford: Oxford University Press. ISBN 978-0-199-36274-5.
- Hodgkin, Thomas (1896). Italy and Her Invaders: The imperial restoration, 535–553. Oxford: Clarendon Press. OCLC 5080433.
- Hughes, Ian (2009). Belisarius: The Last Roman General. Yardley, PA: Westholme. ISBN 978-1-594-16085-1. OCLC 294885267.
- Martindale, John R. (1992). The Prosopography of the Later Roman Empire 2 Part Set: Volume 3, AD 527-641. Cambridge University Press. ISBN 978-0-521-20160-5.
- Petersen, Leif I. R. (2013). Siege Warfare and Military Organization in the Successor States (400-800 AD): Byzantium, the West and Islam. Leiden: Brill. ISBN 978-9-004-25446-6.
- Syvänne, Ilkka (2021). Military History of Late Rome 518–565. Yorkshire, PA: Pen and Sword Military. ISBN 978-1-4738-9530-0.
