= Artabazes (military officer) =

Byzantine military officer killed in a duel (died 542)

- Ἀρταβάζης
- Died: 542
- Military career
- Allegiance: Sasanian Empire (until 541); Byzantine Empire (541–542)
- Conflicts: Byzantine-Sasanian wars; Siege of Sisauranon (541) (POW); Gothic War; Siege of Verona; Battle of Faventia (DOW)

Artabazes (Greek: Ἀρταβάζης; died 542), whose name is often Latinized as Ardabastus, was a Persarmenian cavalryman who served first in the Sasanian army and later as a military officer in the Byzantine army after his capture. He fought in the Byzantine-Sasanian wars and joined the Byzantine forces sent to Italy in the Gothic War (535–554).

In 542, he led a Byzantine force in the infiltration of Verona, with the Gothic garrison leaving the city. However, the main Byzantine army arrived late, allowing the Gothic garrison to reorganize and return, trapping Artabazes and his forces inside the city. They eventually escaped by jumping from the battlements. The Byzantine army then moved to Faventia, but it was pursued by the Gothic king Totila. Artabazes urged an attack on the Gothic army as it was crossing the river, but disagreements among the Byzantine commanders cost them the opportunity. Shortly before the Battle of Faventia, Artabazes accepted a challenge of single combat against the Gothic champion Valaris. He defeated him, but he was mortally wounded and died three days later.

== Etymology ==
The name is a variant of Artavasdes from Old Iranian Ṛtavazdā, meaning "powerful/persevering through truth".

== Biography ==
Artabazes was a Persarmenian, and contemporary historian Procopius praises him as a good soldier. He originally served as a cavalryman (aswār) in the garrison of Sisauranon, a frontier stronghold of the Sasanian Empire which was captured by Byzantine general Belisarius. Together with his commander Bleschames and 800 other cavalrymen, he was sent to Italy to fight alongside the Byzantines in the Gothic War (535–554).

He is first recorded in 542 as an archon of the Byzantine army, but his rank is not specified in primary sources. He was one of the Byzantine troops marching to besiege the city of Verona, an Ostrogoth (Goth) stronghold. The Byzantine forces consisted of about 12,000 men, with Constantianus and Alexander as co-commanders. The Byzantines managed to bribe or otherwise win over Marcianus, one of the sentinels of the city, who was to open a city gate at night so that a small Byzantine unit would seize the gate and prepare the entry for the rest of the army. Artabazes was chosen to lead the operation and his unit for the night consisted of 100 hand-picked men. The small force entered the city and took control of the gate and the wall on both sides after killing the Gothic guards. The remaining Goths panicked and fled outside the city to a hill overlooking it, where they remained through the night. However, the rest of the Byzantine army failed to arrive on time because the co-commanders were allegedly involved in a nightly dispute over how to divide the plunder once the city was taken. The Gothic garrison had time to organize and returned early the next morning through the same city gate they had left, which was still open. The Artabazes's forces became trapped within the city. The subsequent fighting was unusual, as the Byzantine men had to resist an attack from inside the city. Byzantine troops retreated towards the battlements. The main Byzantine army arrived, but found the city gates closed with the Goths in control of the city. Artabazes begged them not to abandon them, but the main army ignored his pleas and started to withdraw. The only way of escape for the trapped Byzantine soldiers was to jump down from the city walls. They did so, with several of them killed by the fall.

Artabazes survived the battle mostly unhurt and returned to the Byzantine camp. He bitterly criticized the delay that cost them victory. The Byzantine army retreated towards Faventia and eventually camped next to a stream variously known as Anemo or Lamone. There, they were met by King Totila of the Goths (r. 541–552), marching against them with about 5,000 men. Artabazes is recorded urging his superiors to attack the enemy forces while they were still crossing the river. He argued that the disorder would gain their side an advantage. Disagreements among the commanders caused the Byzantines to miss this opportunity. The Goths crossed the river unopposed and marched to the Byzantine camp.

The Goths, who were waiting for a Gothic detachment to encircle the Byzantines, delayed the fighting by issuing a challenge to single combat. Valaris rode to the middle of the battlefield to issue the challenge. He was a champion of the Goths, reportedly a giant of a man, whose appearance terrified his opponents. Artabazes accepted the challenge and managed to slay his opponent, but he himself was accidentally wounded in the throat by the erected spear of the dead Goth. While the wound did not kill him immediately, he died three days later. In the battle that ensued after Artabazes's victory, Totila defeated the Byzantines by successfully encircling them.

== Sources ==
- Bury, John Bagnell (1958). History of the Later Roman Empire: From the Death of Theodosius I to the Death of Justinian. Vol. 2. Mineola, New York: Dover Publications.
- Evans, John; Head, Barclay V., eds. (1876). The Numismatic Chronicle and Journal of the Numismatic Society. OCLC 756480670.
- Martindale, John R. (1992). The Prosopography of the Later Roman Empire 2 Part Set: Volume 3, AD 527–641. Cambridge University Press. ISBN 978-0-521-20160-5.
- Petersen, Leif Inge Ree (15 September 2013). Siege Warfare and Military Organization in the Successor States (400–800 AD): Byzantium, the West and Islam. Brill. ISBN 978-90-04-25446-6.
- Syvänne, Ilkka (2021). Military History of Late Rome 518–565. Yorkshire, PA: Pen and Sword Military. ISBN 978-1-47-389530-0.
- Schmitt, Rüdiger (15 December 1986), Artavasdes, Encyclopaedia Iranica, doi:10.1163/2330-4804_EIRO_COM_5829
