= Siege of Sisauranon (541) =

Siege during the Byzantine-Sasanian War

- Part of Belisarius' invasion of Mesopotamia in 541
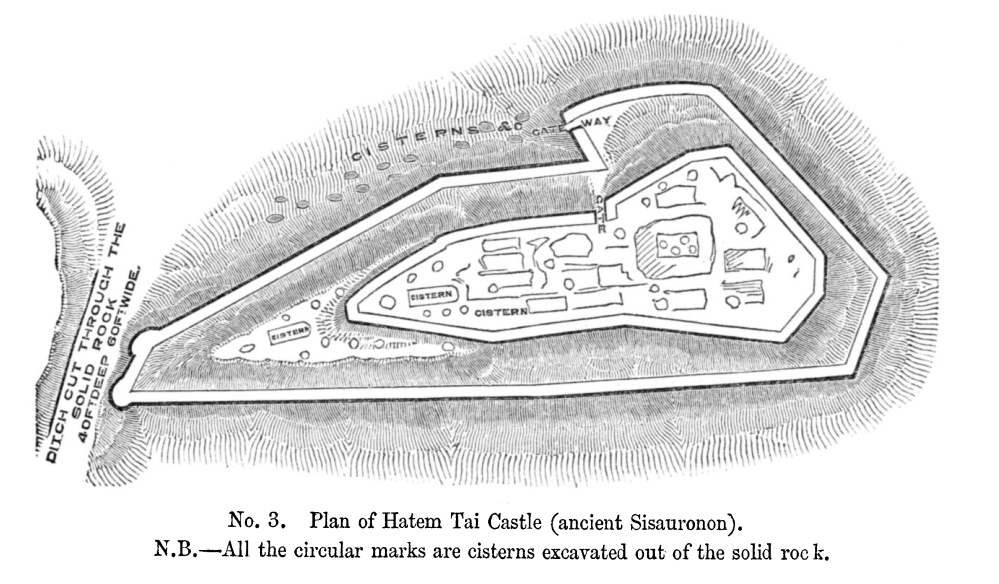
- Map of Sisauronon fortress
Date	541
Location	Sisauranon, Arbayistan, Sasanian Empire 37.1126°N 41.62805°E
Result	Byzantine victory

Belligerents
Byzantine Empire; Ghassanids	Sasanian Empire

Commanders and leaders
Belisarius; Arethas	Bleschames

Strength
Unknown	800 Persian cavalry

Casualties and losses
Unknown	All defected

The siege of Sisauranon took place in 541 between Byzantine forces under Belisarius and the Sassanian (Persian) garrison of the Sisauranon fortress under Bleschames.

In 541, Emperor Justinian I sent Belisarius to invade Persian territory alongside Byzantine forces and Ghassanid allies led by Arethas. After failing to capture Nisibis, Belisarius turned his attention to the nearby fortress of Sisauranon. After failing to capture it by force, Belisarius laid a blockade and sent Arethas on a reconnaissance expedition across the Tigris River into Persian territory, where his forces gathered considerable booty. The Persian garrison in Sisauranon surrendered due to supply shortages, and it was sent to Constantinople. In the meantime, Arethas deceived the Byzantines to keep his booty and disappeared. Facing extreme heat, widespread illness, and uncertainty about the Persian threat, Belisarius retreated into Byzantine territory.

== Background ==
In 541, the Byzantine emperor Justinian I sent general Belisarius to launch a campaign in the East. He set out from Dara with his forces and Ghassanid allies under their king Arethas. They camped near Nisibis and then tried to lure out the Persian garrison and defeat them in the field before beginning a regular siege. This was unsuccessful as the Persian garrison under Nabedes performed a surprise attack and retreated to the fortified city.

Belisarius decided against besieging Nisibis because of its strong defenses and the failure to eliminate its garrison. Instead, he advanced towards Sisauranon, a nearby frontier fortress. Contemporary historian Procopius describes it as a populous city defended by 800 Persian cavalrymen under Bleschames. (Note: Historian Ilkka Syvänne argues that Procopius may have exaggerated Sisauranon's size and population.)

== Siege ==
Belisarius established a camp near Sisauranon and prepared his troops for an assault. However, the city's strong walls repelled the Byzantine assault, resulting in heavy casualties. Belisarius then convened a meeting of his officers and explained that advancing further into Persian territory would be dangerous, proposing instead to continue the siege of Sisauranon. The garrisons at Nisibis and Sisauranon could threaten Byzantine supply lines, while another Persian force might confront them ahead. He additionally proposed launching a reconnaissance mission into the Assyria region across the Tigris River, near the Persian capital of Ctesiphon. The officers approved the proposed plan.

Belisarius dispatched Arethas with approximately 5,000 Arab cavalry, reinforced by 1,200 Byzantine soldiers, mostly his own hypaspistai under two military commanders named Trajan and John. Arethas was ordered to plunder the territory and report on Persian military strength. (Note: According to Procopius, "the Saracens are by nature unable to storm a wall, but the cleverest of all men at plundering".) Crossing the Tigris River, his forces entered Assyria and quickly accumulated considerable booty, as the region had not been raided for a long time.

In the meantime, prisoners captured by Belisarius's men revealed that the local Persian forces were poorly prepared for war and lacked the supplies to withstand a prolonged siege. With this information, the Byzantines renewed their siege of Sisauranon, and its defenders soon found themselves short of provisions. Belisarius sent his confidant to negotiate surrender, and the defenders capitulated. He spared the inhabitants, who were Christians of Byzantine origin, but demolished the city's fortifications.

== Aftermath ==
Fearing that Belisarius would seize the spoils upon his return, Arethas deceived the Byzantines by arranging for false reports of a large Persian force near the Tigris River and directing Trajan and John to take a separate route. As a result, Belisarius lost contact with Arethas's forces and became concerned about their disappearance. Meanwhile, the Byzantine army at Sisauranon suffered from the extreme heat and dry climate of Mesopotamia, with nearly a third of the soldiers reportedly incapacitated by fever and exhaustion. Byzantine troops urged Belisarius to withdraw, citing missing forces, declining health of the troops, and a lack of reliable intelligence. Belisarius accepted their recommendation and led the army back into Byzantine territory, placing the sick in carts at the front of the retreat. Upon returning, Belisarius learned of Arethas's deception but could not punish him because he had disappeared.

The defected Persian garrison was sent to Constantinople and then sent on to take part in the Gothic War. They participated in the Siege of Verona and the Battle of Faventia. Among them was Artabazes, whose men took over the city gate in Verona and fought single combat at Faventina.
