= Coccas (soldier) =

Eastern Roman soldier (died 552)

Coccas (Greek: Κόκκας, died 552) was an Eastern Roman soldier who deserted to the Ostrogoths during the final stages of the Gothic War. Procopius calls him "a Roman soldier" and "a man of the Gothic army". His name is not Germanic, and might be Thracian.

Coccas was part of Ostrogothic king Totila's army at the Battle of Taginae in June/July 552. He is described as a cavalryman of great physical strength. In order to gain time for the arrival of 2,000 reinforcements led by Teia, Coccas rode towards the Romans and requested them to send forth a champion to engage him in single combat. Anzalas, an Armenian retainer of the Roman commander Narses, accepted the challenge. Coccas charged at Anzalas and aimed at his stomach, but at the last moment, Anzalas swerved his horse and stabbed Coccas in the side, mortally wounding him. Although Coccas' sacrifice gained him the necessary time for the arrival of Teia, Totila died in the ensuing battle, which was a disaster for the Goths.

== See also ==
- Valaris
- Artabazes

== Sources ==
- Amory, Patrick (2003). People and Identity in Ostrogothic Italy, 489-554. Cambridge University Press. ISBN 0521526353.
- Bury, John Bagnell (1958) [1923]. History of the Later Roman Empire: From the Death of Theodosius I to the Death of Justinian, Volume 2. Mineola, New York: Dover Publications. OCLC 41478187.
