= Anzalas =

Armenian soldier in the Roman army during the gothic war

Anzalas (Greek: ανζαλας, died 552?) was an Armenian soldier and retainer of Narses who fought for the Eastern Roman Empire against the Ostrogoth kingdom in the Gothic Wars.

Anzalas slayed the Byzantine deserter Coccas, who was in service of the Gothic army after accepting the latter's duel before the Battle of Taginae.

== See also ==
- Coccas
- Valaris
