= Siege of Petra (541) =

Siege during the Lazic War

- Part of the Lazic War
- Map of Lazica in Late Antiquity
Date	541
Location	Petra, Lazica 41°46′06″N 41°45′12″E
Result	Sasanian victory

Belligerents
Byzantine Empire	Sasanian Empire

Commanders and leaders
John Tzibus †	Khosrow I; Gubazes II of Lazica; Aniabedes

The siege of Petra took place in 541 when the Sasanian Empire, under King Khosrow I, besieged the town of Petra in Lazica, held by the Byzantine Empire, and it marked the opening stage of the Lazic War.

The conflict began after Byzantine Emperor Justinian I, on the advice of one of his officials, John Tzibus, established a fortress at Petra and imposed a trade monopoly on the local population, causing resentment among the citizens of Lazica. In response, the king of Lazica Gubazes II appealed to Khosrow for help expelling the Byzantines in return for his kingdom. Khosrow accepted and led his army into Lazica in secrecy, where he joined forces with Gubazes to capture Petra.

At the beginning of the siege, the Byzantine defenders under Tzibus conducted a successful surprise attack by pretending the fortress was deserted, causing heavy Sasanian casualties. Despite initial setbacks, the Sasanians turned the tide after the death of Tzibus. They also destroyed one of the defensive towers through mining operations. The defenders came to terms with the Sasanians and joined their army.

== Background ==
The fortress in Petra, Lazica, south of the Phasis River, was the opening stage of the Lazic War. Byzantine Emperor Justinian built the fortress on the advice of his ambitious official, magister militum per Armeniam John Tzibus. At Petra, Tzibus established a trade monopoly and acted as an intermediary, forcing the merchants of Lazica to buy essential goods, such as grain and salt, at inflated prices. The monopoly provided a way for Byzantines to tax the citizens of Lazica in exchange for their defense. However, the Byzantine garrison served imperial interests and was unwelcome to locals.

Frustrated by the exploitation resulting from the Byzantine trade monopoly, the king of Lazica, Gubazes II, appealed to the Sasanian (Persian) king Khosrow I for help expelling the Byzantines. Gubazes argued that Persia would gain access to the Black Sea if Lazica passed under Persian control. Such access would allow them to threaten Byzantium from Lazica's waters and form alliances with enemies of the Byzantine Empire north of the Caucasus. Khosrow accepted the offer but concealed his intentions. While claiming he needed to travel to Iberia for pressing affairs (to intercept invading Huns), Khosrow led his army through Colchis's dense forests and difficult mountain passes, cutting down trees to create paths through the rugged terrain. After passing through, the Sasanian forces met and joined Gubazes, who officially gave the kingdom to Khosrow. The main objective of the Sasanids was to capture Petra, where Tzibus had concentrated his forces.

== Siege ==
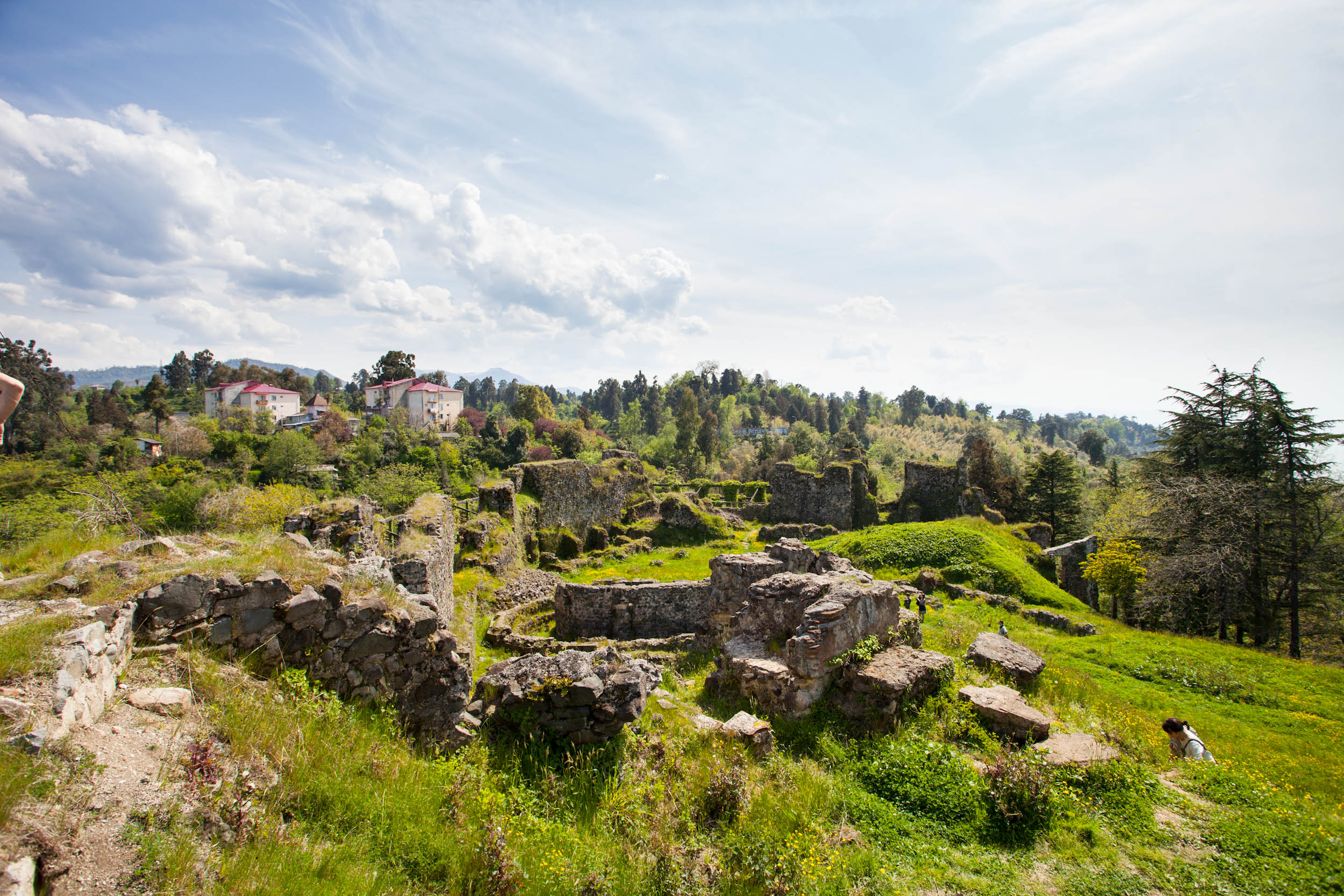
Ruins of the fortress of Petra

Khosrow sent a detachment under Aniabedes to attack the fort, but it appeared deserted. Tzibus had ordered the Byzantine garrison to remain silent and out of sight of the approaching Sasanian troops. Aniabedes informed Khosrow of the situation and was given command of a significant part of the army to take the fortress, while Khosrow seated himself upon a nearby hill and became a spectator of the operations. Aniabedes sent troops with a battering-ram to destroy the gate. However, when the Sasanids approached the city fortifications, Byzantine forces rushed out of the gate in a surprise attack and killed the Sasanians operating the battering-ram. According to the contemporary historian Procopius, Aniabedes, who was charged with the operation of the battering-ram, was impaled for the crime of being vanquished by a merchant.

The Sasanians then camped near the fortifications and began a regular siege. On the following day, the Sasanians went completely around the fort and began firing arrows at the defenders on the parapet, and the Byzantines responded by firing arrows and using war engines. The Byzantines had the upper hand because they were shooting arrows from an elevated position. However, Tzibus was killed by an arrow in the neck, demoralizing the defenders. The Sasanians retreated to their camp for the day.

Petra featured rough terrain and unusually strong defensive towers, which, instead of being hollow, were made of solid stone and rose to a great height. In the following days, the Sasanians destroyed one of the two defensive towers through mining operations. The miners removed stones from its base and replaced them with wood. They then set the wood on fire, gradually weakening the upper layers of stone. Eventually, the tower collapsed, allowing the Sasanians to enter the fort through the walls. The defenders then surrendered and came to terms.

== Aftermath ==
The Sasanians seized the possessions of Tzibus, but left everything else untouched. The surviving Byzantine forces joined the Sasanian army. Khosrow installed a Sasanian garrison in Petra and then he withdrew to his own lands after learning of Byzantine advances led by general Belisarius, who captured Sisauranon.
