= Adurfrazgird =

Sasanian prince

Map showing the Roman-Sasanian borders

Adurfrazgird was a Sasanian prince, who served as the governor of Nisibis under his brother Shapur II (r. 309–379). His name is derived from the Avestan frašō.kərəti ("having the furtherance of fire"). There is no evidence that Adurfrazgird was older or younger than Shapur II. He most likely had another mother, who was either another wife of his father Hormizd II, or perhaps a concubine.

According to the Syriac Acts of the Persian Martyrs, the western frontier province of Arbayistan was divided in the 360s between Adurfrazgird and his brother Zamasp; Adurfrazgird governed Nisibis whilst Zamasp governed an area along the Tigris river. The two brothers were to keep an eye for each other and Roman activities. Zamasp was noted for his persecution of Christians.

== Sources ==
- Brunner, C. J. (1983). "Ādurfrāzgird". Encyclopaedia Iranica, Vol. I, Fasc. 5. p. 478.
