= Rhabdion =

Fortress of the Roman Empire

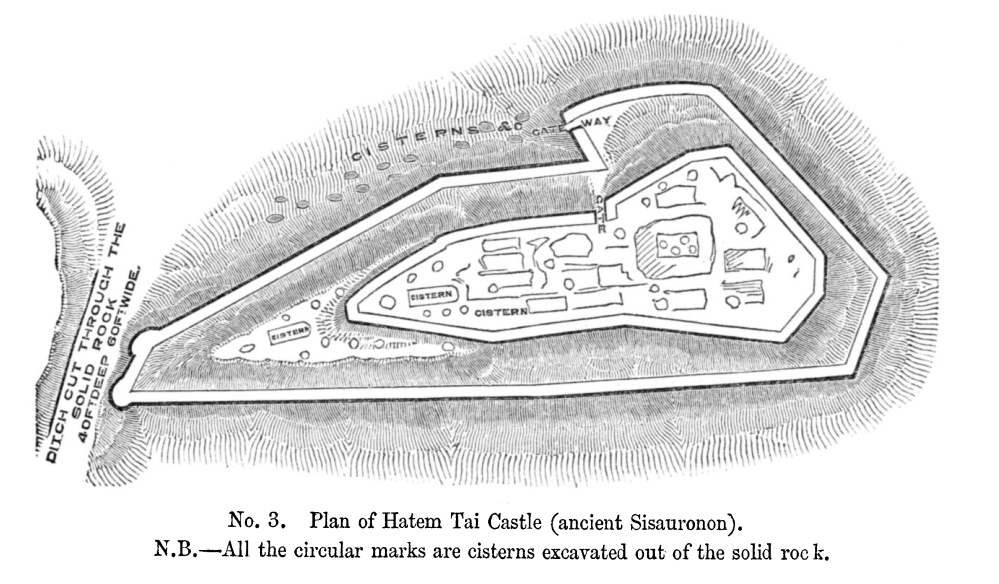
- Sketch of Hatem Tai Castle by John George Taylor (1865)

Site information
- Type: Fortress

Location
- Site within modern Turkey
- Coordinates: 37°12′38″N 41°36′44″E

Site history
- Battles/wars: Roman–Persian Wars

Rhabdion (Greek: Ῥάβδιον, romanized: Rhábdion) was a Late Antique fortress of the Roman Empire, located on the Tur Abdin plateau to the northeast of Nisibis on the border with the Sasanian Empire. The fortress was later known as Qalʿat Haytham and is now identified with Hatem Tai, a fortification (Turkish: kalesi, lit. 'castle') in south-eastern Turkey.

== History ==
It was probably built, along with Amida (Diyarbakır) and Cepha (Hasankeyf), by the emperor Constantius II (r. 337–361). According to the Life of Simeon of the Olives, a certain Demetrius was ordered to build the castle in 350/351 AD and hence the fortress was also known as Demetrius' castle.After the cession by the emperor Jovian (r. 363–364) of the five Transtigritine provinces and some border forts to the Sasanian Empire under Shapur II (r. 309–379) as a result of the Persians' victory in Julian's Persian War, Rhabdion became the easternmost Roman frontier outpost, perhaps even de facto exclave in Persian territory, since the only road to it appears to have been from the south, passing across the plain by the Persian-controlled city of Nisibis.

The Hatem Tai kalesi was visited in the early 1860s by John George Taylor, then British consul in Diyarbakır, who sketched its outline in his Travels in Kurdistan (Journal of the Royal Geographical Society, Vol. 35, 1865). At the time, the Hatem Tai kalesi was identified with another ancient fortress known from the history of the Roman–Persian Wars of Late Antiquity, Sisauranon.

The kalesi may have given its name to the region of Tur Abdin.

== Sources ==
- Brunner, Kyle (31 December 2021). "Chapter 3. Simeon of the Olives and his World: Life on the Khabur Basin during the early Islamic period". The Life of Simeon of the Olives: 47–78. doi:10.31826/9781463243470-005. ISBN 978-1-4632-4347-0.
- Comfort, Anthony Martin (14 May 2009). Roads on the frontier between Rome and Persia: Euphratesia, Osrhoene and Mesopotamia from AD 363 to 602 (Ph.D.). University of Exeter. hdl:10036/68213.
- Comfort, Anthony (2017). "Fortresses of the Tur Abdin and the confrontation between Rome and Persia". Anatolian Studies. 67: 181–229. doi:10.1017/s0066154617000047.
- Keser-Kayaalp, Elif (2018). "Tur 'Abdin". In Nicholson, Oliver (ed.). The Oxford Dictionary of Late Antiquity. Oxford: Oxford University Press. pp. 1530–1531. ISBN 978-0-19-866277-8.
