= Bleschames =

Persian military officer

- Military career
- Allegiance: Sasanian Empire (until 541); Byzantine Empire
- Branch: Sasanian army (until 541); Byzantine army
- Commands: Sassanian garrison of Sisauranon; Persian mercenary unit in the Gothic War
- Conflicts: Lazic War: Siege of Sisauranon (541) (POW); Gothic War (535–554)

Bleschames (Greek: Βλησχάμης) was a Persian military officer, who first served the Sasanian Empire and from 541 the Byzantine Empire. He is first mentioned in 541 as the head of the Sasanian garrison of the fortress Sisauranon, where he defected to the Byzantine army under Belisarius, who sent him and 800 Sasanian cavalrymen to the Byzantine capital of Constantinople. However, he did not stay there for long, and was sent to Italy in order to fight the Ostrogothic Kingdom in the Gothic War, while some of his men were sent to fight under Artabazes. Nothing else is known of his life.

== Sources ==
- Martindale, John Robert; Jones, Arnold Hugh Martin; Morris, J., eds. (1992). The Prosopography of the Later Roman Empire, Volume III: A.D. 527–641. Cambridge, United Kingdom: Cambridge University Press. ISBN 978-0-521-20160-5.
