= Nabedes =

Sasanian military commander during the reign of Khosrow I

Naved, Nabed, Nahbed, Nabedes (Greek: Ναβέδης Nabédēs), or Nobades was a Sasanian military commander during the reign of Khosrow I.

He is first recorded as the commander of Nisibis, engaging the Romans in a battle during Belisarius invasion of Mesopotamia in 541. In a speech to his soldiers before the battle, Belisarius had described Nabedes to be the "first among the Persians in glory and in every other sort of honour" after Khosrow I himself. In 543, Nabedes and his outnumbered forces defeated a major Byzantine invasion of Armenia in an ambush at Anglon. During the Lazic War, he did a conquest in 550, reaching Abasgia and taking hostages, including Theodora, the wife of Opsites of Lazica.
