= Scheggia =

Scheggia may refer to:

- Scheggia e Pascelupo, a comune (municipality) in the Province of Perugia in the Italian region Umbria.
- Scheggia Pass, a pass in the Italian region Umbria that divides the Northern and Central Apennines.
- Giovanni di ser Giovanni Guidi known as Scheggia (b. 1406, San Giovanni Valdarno, d. 1486, Firenze)
