= Alexander (discussor) =

Alexander (Greek: Αλέξανδρος) was a senior financial official of the Byzantine Empire, active in the reign of Justinian I (r. 527–565). His title is reported as "discussor" in Latin and logothetēs in Greek. He was reportedly nicknamed "Scissors" or "Snips" (Greek: Ψαλίδιος, romanized: Psalídios, Psalidius), for trimming down the size of gold coins. The main source about him is Procopius.

== Biography ==
His title is reported as "discussor" in Latin and logothetēs in Greek. While clearly a financial official, normally based at Constantinople, Alexander was reportedly sent on special missions and even assumed military duties. He may have held the additional titles of "scriniarius" (notary) or "numerarius" (accountant). His post being one specifically dealing with the military.

=== Army payment ===
Procopius reports that Alexander became notorious for his practice of accusing the Byzantine army of defrauding the state. His office allowed him to save large sums of money for the state and also enrich himself, through questionable practices. "Nor assuredly is his treatment of the soldiers to be consigned to silence; for over them he put in authority the most villainous of all men, bidding them collect from this source as much as they could, and these officers were well aware that the twelfth part of what they should thus procure should fall to them. And he gave them the title of "Logothetes." And these each year devised the following scheme. According to a law the military pay is not given to all alike year after year, but when the men are still young and have only recently joined the army, the rate is lower, while for those who have been in service and are now at about the middle of the muster-roll, it grows larger. But when they have grown old and are on the point of being discharged from the army, the pay is very much more imposing, to the end not only that they may, when in future they are living as private citizens, have sufficient for their own maintenance, but may also, when it is their lot to have completely measured out the term of life, be able to leave from their own property some consolation to the members of their households. Thus time, by continuously promoting the soldiers who are lower down in the scale to the rank of those who have died or been discharged from the army, regulates on the basis of seniority the payments to be made from the Treasury to each man. But the Logothetes, as they are called, would not allow the names of the deceased to be removed from the rolls, even when great numbers died at one time from other causes, and especially, as was the case with the most, in the course of the numerous wars. Furthermore, they would no longer fill out the muster-rolls, and that too for a long period. And the result of this practice has proved unfortunate for all concerned — first, for the State in that the number of soldiers in active service is always deficient; secondly, for the surviving soldiers, in that they are elbowed out by those who have died long before and so find themselves left in a position inferior to what they deserve, and that they receive a pay which is lower than if they had the rank to which they are entitled; and, finally, for the Logothetes, who all this time have had to apportion to Justinian a share of the soldiers' money.

"Furthermore, they [the Logothetai] kept grinding down the soldiers with many other forms of penalties, as though to requite them thus for the dangers incurred in the wars, charging some with being "Greeks", as though it were wholly impossible for any man from Greece to be a decent man, others with being in the service without an order from the Emperor, even though they could show, on this point, an imperial order, which, however, the Logothetes with no hesitation had the effrontery to denounce; and others still they accused on the ground that for some days they had chanced to be absent from their comrades. Later on also some of the Palace Guards were sent out through the whole Roman Empire, and ostensibly they were in search of any among the armies who were quite unsuitable for active service; and they dared to strip the belts from some of these as being unfit or too old, and these thereafter had to beg their bread from the pious in the public square of the market-place, so that they became a constant cause for tears and lamentation on the part of all who met them; and from the rest they exacted great sums of money, to the end that they might not suffer the same fate, so that the soldiers, broken in manifold ways, had become the poorest of all men and had not the slightest zest for warfare. It was for just this reason that the Roman power came to be destroyed in Italy."

=== Thermopylae ===
In Alexander was sent in Italy, soon after the recall of Belisarius. He first made a stop at Thermopylae, where he re-organized the local defense. A guard mostly consisting of local farmers was replaced with regular troops. The cost of their presence there was effectively paid by all the cities of Greece. Their civic and entertainment funds were diverted to the imperial treasury under this pretext, a decision approved by Justinian. Procopius has a rather grim view of Alexander's handling of the situation: "The outpost at Thermopylae had from early times been under the care of the farmers of that region, and they used to take turns in guarding the wall there, whenever it was expected that some barbarians or other would make a descent upon the Peloponnesus. But when Alexander visited the place on the occasion in question, he, pretending that he was acting in the interests of the Peloponnesians, refused to entrust the outpost there to the farmers. So he stationed troops there to the number of two thousand and ordained that their pay should not be provided from the imperial Treasury, but instead he transferred to the Treasury the entire civic funds and the funds for the spectacles of all the cities of Greece, on the pretext that these soldiers were to be maintained therefrom, and consequently in all Greece, and not least in Athens itself, no public building was restored nor could any other needful thing be done. Justinian, however, without any hesitation confirmed these measures of "Snips." "

=== Italy ===
Once Alexander arrived in Italy, he took financial measures which proved unpopular. He increased the financial demands on the Italian cities and population, while reducing the funds of the army stationed there. Effectively alienating both groups. "Indeed, when Alexander the Logothete was sent thither [Italy], he had the effrontery to lay these charges without compunction upon the soldiers, and he tried to exact money from the Italians, alleging that he was punishing them for their behaviour during the reign of Theoderic and the Goths. And it was not alone the soldiers who were oppressed by destitution and poverty through the conduct of the Logothetes, but also the subordinates who served all the generals, formerly a numerous and highly esteemed group, laboured under the burden of starvation and dire poverty. For they had not the means wherewith to provide themselves with their customary necessities."

Alexander took another controversial decision in abolishing the annual corn ration of the poor in Rome. It was an unnecessary expense for the state, but abolishing it ensured that the poor would starve."Theoderic commanded that this custom be transmitted to their offspring and descendants. And to the beggars who had their station beside the Church of Peter the Apostle, he ordered that the Treasury should for ever supply each year three thousand measures of corn. These pensions all these beggars continued to receive until Alexander, called "Snips," arrived in Italy. For this man decided immediately, without any hesitation, to abolish them all. Upon learning this, Justinian, Emperor of the Romans, put the stamp of his approval upon this course of action and held Alexander in still higher honour than formerly."

In 541, Constantianus, Alexander and nine others led the Byzantine army against the city of Verona, a stronghold of the Ostrogoths. Their army was eventually defeated at the Battle of Faventia (542).

A letter of Totila to the Roman Senate mentions Alexander as an example "of imperial injustice and oppression". This seems to be the last mention of him. His fate following Faventia is unknown.

== Sources ==
- Martindale, John R.; Jones, A.H.M.; Morris, John (1992), The Prosopography of the Later Roman Empire, Volume III: AD 527–641, Cambridge University Press, ISBN 0-521-20160-8
- Procopius of Caesarea; Dewing, Henry Bronson (1914), History of the wars. vol. 3, Books V-VI, Cambridge University Press, ISBN 0-674-99054-4
- Procopius of Caesarea; Dewing, Henry Bronson (1935), Secret History, Cambridge University Press
