= Battle of Faventia =

6th-century battle of the Gothic War

- Part of the Gothic War (535–554)
- Main army movements during the second phase of the Gothic War
Date	Spring 542 AD
Location	Faventia (now Faenza), Italy 44°17′08″N 11°53′00″E
Result	Ostrogothic victory

Belligerents
Byzantine Empire	Ostrogothic Kingdom

Commanders and leaders
Constantinianus; Alexander	Totila

Strength
12,000	5,000
- Location within Italy Battle of Faventia (Mediterranean)

The Battle of Faventia (modern-day Faenza) took place in the spring of 542 AD, where the new king Totila of the Ostrogoths (Goths) defeated a larger Byzantine force under the generals Constantinianus and Alexander. The victory reinforced the Gothic resistance in the second phase of the Gothic War (535–554).

Following the failed Siege of Verona by the Byzantines, Totila, with about 5,000 men, pursued the retreating Byzantine force of roughly 12,000 troops. Totila, having the initiative, sent 300 men on a different route and attacked the rear of the Byzantine army. While the Byzantine leadership debated a course of action, Totila's army crossed the river Po and advanced to engage the Byzantines. To delay the battle until the Gothic detachment was ready, a Gothic champion named Valaris challenged the Byzantines to single combat. Valaris was slain by the Byzantine commander Artabazes the Armenian, who was also mortally wounded. The battle soon commenced, and in the heat of the engagement, the Goths attacked the Byzantine rear. The surprise attack caused panic to spread among the Byzantine troops, who broke formation and fled the field. The victory marked the beginning of a resurgence of Gothic resistance against the Byzantine reconquest of the Italian Peninsula.

== Background ==
Following the fall of Ravenna, the capital of the Gothic kingdom, in May 540 AD, the Byzantine general Belisarius had succeeded in restoring former Western Roman territories (Sicily and most of the Italian Peninsula) to Byzantine rule. However, Byzantine Emperor Justinian recalled Belisarius to Constantinople, because he was alarmed by his general's stratagem, which induced the Goths to surrender by offering Belisarius the Western Roman imperial crown. Although Belisarius returned to Constantinople in mid-summer 540 with Ravenna's treasury and the defeated Gothic King Vitiges as prisoner, Justinian refused him a triumph. The general was also needed on the eastern front against the Persians in the upcoming Lazic War (541–562).

Justinian replaced Belisarius with three commanders of equal authority: Bessas, John the Sanguinary, and Constantinianus. The three commanders fell into rivalry and turned to plundering the Italian population instead of fighting the remaining Goths. The situation deteriorated further when Justinian imposed a severe tax audit, compelling Italians to pay alleged arrears dating from Gothic rule, while simultaneously reducing soldiers' rewards for wounds and acts of bravery. This climate of lawlessness undermined discipline, alienated the troops, and rapidly destroyed Italian loyalty to the empire.

Belisarius's withdrawal from Italy emboldened the newly crowned Gothic king, Ildibad, whose position was strengthened by the corrupt rule of the Byzantine commanders and harsh taxation. He defeated a Byzantine force at Treviso, allowing the Goths to reclaim much of the Po Valley. His success was brief as he was assassinated before securing his rule. Unable to agree on a suitable successor from among themselves, the Goths elected Eraric, who belonged to a tribe distinct from the Goths. Eraric called a council and won approval to send envoys to Constantinople to seek peace on terms previously offered to Vitigis before Ravenna's fall. Privately, he offered to abdicate and hand over northern Italy to Justinian in return for the rank of patrician and a large payment. In late 541, Eraric was killed by Gothic nobles for this betrayal, and Ildibad's nephew Totila became king.

== Prelude ==
Justinian realized that the Goths were paralyzed by internal dissensions, and his Byzantine commanders stationed in Italy had not done anything to exploit the situation. He sent a letter reprimanding them for their inactivity and demanded action. The Byzantine commanders John the Sanguinary, Bessas and Cyprian gathered in Ravenna to debate their course of action. They decided to send a 12,000-strong army to take Verona, one of the last outposts of Gothic power. The army had eleven commanders with two at the top of the command, Constantinianus and Alexander. While Constantinianus was the de facto commander-in-chief, he lacked the skill and authority to compel the other commanders to follow his commands.

The failed Siege of Verona signaled to the new king of the Goths, Totila, to take initiative while the Byzantines remained under poor leadership. Totila with a 5,000-strong army pursued the Byzantines, who had retreated across the river Po on the stream Lamone, near Faventia.

== Battle ==
Before crossing the river, Totila dispatched 300 men by a roundabout route along the river for 20 stades (3.7 km [2.3 mi]). They crossed the river to strike the Byzantines from behind their camp, while Totila and the main army crossed the river to engage the Byzantines head-on. The Byzantines convened a council upon hearing of Totila's advance. The contemporary Procopius reports that Artabazes the Armenian sensibly suggested allowing half the Gothic army to cross the river before launching an attack. Disagreements among the commanders caused the Byzantines to miss this opportunity. The Goths crossed the river unopposed and marched to the Byzantine camp.

The Goths delayed the fighting by issuing a challenge to single combat. Valaris, the Gothic champion, rode to the middle of the battlefield. Artabazes accepted the challenge for the Byzantines. Artabazes slew Valaris with a thrust of his long spear, but in doing so, he was wounded when his horse carried him against the upright spear. Physicians attempted to treat his injuries, but he died three days later. The loss of a capable commander was a blow to the Byzantines.

The battle commenced soon after the duel. Once the fighting reached its height, the 300 Goths attacked the rear of the Byzantine lines. Panic spread among the Byzantines, who broke ranks and fled, leaving the Byzantine standards to fall into the hands of the Goths.

== Aftermath ==
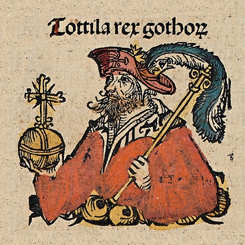
Totila in the Nuremberg Chronicle, 1493

Following his success against the Byzantines, Totila sent part of his troops to attack Florence. Justin, the Byzantine commander of Florence, had neglected to adequately provision the city against a siege since he was not expecting an attack. He hurriedly sent for aid to the other Byzantine commanders in the area: John, Bessas and Cyprian. They gathered their forces and came to the relief of Florence, but they were defeated in the Battle of Mucellium. The Goths took captives, who were treated well and even induced to join the Gothic army. (Note: According to Procopius, Totila "showed great kindness to his prisoners, and thereby succeeded in winning their allegiance, and henceforth most of them voluntarily served under him against the Romans".) Totila then seized Caesena and Petra Pertusa, but when he moved into Tuscany none of the towns surrendered, remaining under Byzantine control. Subsequently, Totila did not attempt to conquer central Italy, where the Byzantines controlled large, well-fortified cities. Instead, he advanced rapidly through southern Italy with great success, including the capture of the fortress of Cumae.

The Byzantine generals and the remaining troops fled to isolated strongholds (Bessas to Spoleto, Justin back to Florence, Cyprian to Perugia, and John to Rome), where they made preparations against a potential siege as they did not want to meet the Goths in the open. They failed to coordinate their efforts against the Goths, leading to the prolongation of the war. (Note: The historian, Ian Hughes, argued that a contributing factor to the fractured Byzantine leadership was the 542 plague on the Italian Peninsula, during which the Byzantine commanders remained in place to avoid contracting the plague.) Justinian sent the civilian Maximin to be Praetorian Prefect of Italy, but Maximin's indecision left him unable to formulate an effective strategy against the Goths. Totila captured Naples and razed its walls. Then he advanced to besiege Rome in spring 544. Upon receiving this news, Justinian recalled general Belisarius from the eastern front, where he commanded a Byzantine force against Persia, and dispatched him to Italy.

== Sources ==
=== Primary ===
- Procopius (1924) [545–553 AD]. Procopius: History of the Wars, Books VI and VII. Translated by Dewing, Henry Bronson. Cambridge, Massachusetts: Harvard University Press. OCLC 50817920.

=== Secondary ===
- Amory, Patrick (2003). People and Identity in Ostrogothic Italy, 489-554. Cambridge University Press. ISBN 978-0-521-52635-7.
- Bury, John Bagnell (1958). History of the Later Roman Empire: From the Death of Theodosius I to the Death of Justinian. Vol. 2. Mineola, New York: Dover Publications, Inc. OCLC 1240424678.
- Heather, Peter J. (2013). The Restoration of Rome: Barbarian Popes and Imperial Pretenders. Oxford University Press. ISBN 978-0199368518. IA restorationofrom0000heat.
- —————— (2018). Rome Resurgent: War and Empire in the Age of Justinian. Oxford: Oxford University Press. ISBN 9780199362745.
- Hodgkin, Thomas (1896). Italy and Her Invaders: The imperial restoration, 535–553. Oxford: Clarendon Press. OCLC 499512107.
- Hughes, Ian (2009). Belisarius: The Last Roman General. Yardley, PA: Westholme. ISBN 9781594160851. OCLC 294885267.
- Martindale, John R. (1992). The Prosopography of the Later Roman Empire 2 Part Set: Volume 3, AD 527-641. Cambridge University Press. ISBN 978-0-521-20160-5.
- Syvänne, Ilkka (2021). Military History of Late Rome 518–565. Yorkshire, PA: Pen and Sword Military. ISBN 978-1-4738-9530-0.
