= Sisauranon =

- Şirvan, Turkey

Site information
- Type: Fortress
- Condition: Ruined

Location
- Site within modern Turkey
- Coordinates: 37.1126°N 41.62805°E

Site history
- Battles/wars: Roman–Persian Wars: Siege of Sisauranon (541); Siege of Sisauranon (589) during the war of 572–591

Sisauranon (Greek: Σισαυράνων; Syriac: Sīrwān), (Note: Alternatively spelt as Servan, Sirouan, or Sirvan.) also known as Sisauronon, Sisaurana, or Sarbane, was a Sasanian fortress city in the province of Arbayistan, located to the east of Nisibis at the edge of the north Syrian plain. It was situated near the border with the Byzantine Empire.

== History ==
Sisauranon is mentioned by Procopius in the 6th century. On linguistic grounds, it is identified with the way-station Sarbane in the 5th-century Tabula Peutingeriana, and with the modern site of Sirvan on the Turkish–Syrian border, whose name probably derives from the ancient settlement. The site is also variously mentioned as Sarbanon (τὸ Σαρβανῶν) in Theophanes the Confessor, Sisarbanon (τὸ Σισαρβάνων) in Theophylact Simocatta, and Sisara in Ammianus Marcellinus, as well as the variant forms of Sisaurion (Σισαύριον), Sisabranon (Σισαβράνων), Isauranon (Ἰσαυρανῶν) in various manuscripts of Procopius. The locality of Sambure in the Ravenna Cosmography may also refer to the same site.

The fortress passed into Sasanian hands in 363, and thereafter played a role in safeguarding the western Sasanian frontier against the Roman-Byzantine Empire. In 541, during the Lazic War, the Byzantine general Belisarius took over the fortress as its commander Bleschames and 800 Sasanian cavalrymen defected due to lack of supplies; they fought alongside the Byzantines in the Gothic War. In 589 during the Byzantine–Sasanian War of 572–591, general Comentiolus captured it once again.

Sisauranon is also mentioned under the name Sīrwān in the eight century hagiography Life of Simeon of the Olives, where the Simeon and his nephew David meet the Persian military general Shahrbaraz at the fortress. Sīrwān is referred to both in the Life of Simeon as well as in the Ecclesiastical History of Pseudo-Zacharias as a ‘city’ (mdittā) rather than a fort, making it more likely that Sisauranon was a complex village settlement rather than a simple military fortress. After the collapse of Sassanian control over the region during the Muslim conquest, the military function of Sisauranon disappeared and the village likely incorporated the fort into its fabric. According to the Life of Simeon and the Mujādalat Abī Qurrā, the Syriac dayrā taḥtāytā (the 'Lower Monastery') was built attached to the village.

In the Syriac Orthodox patriarchal register of dues of 1870, it was recorded that the village had 25 households, who paid 144 dues, and did not have a church or a priest. It was located in the Nusaybin kaza in the Mardin sanjak in the Diyarbekir vilayet in c. 1900. It was populated by 300 Syriacs in 1914, according to the list presented to the Paris Peace Conference by the Assyro-Chaldean delegation.

== Location ==
The fort lies on an artificial mound, some 545 m high, possibly of Bronze Age origin. As late as 2006, some of the fort's walls were still extant on the site, but the remains of Roman roads reported in 1927 appear to have vanished. Despite the small area of the present-day remains, which indicate a small fort, Procopius calls the site a πόλισμα, indicating the existence of a small civilian settlement. The plain around the fort was known as ‘the Roman Field’ (ho rhōmaiōn agros) and is crossed by many streams coming from Mount Izla.

The Roman fortress of Rhabdion (modern-day Hatem Tai Kalesi, Turkey) is located on the steep slope just 6.5 kilometers to the north-west of Sisauranon. In the 19th century, it was erroneously identified as Sisauranon.

== Bibliography ==
- Bcheiry, Iskandar (2009). The Syriac Orthodox Patriarchal Register of Dues of 1870: An Unpublished Historical Document from the Late Ottoman Period. Gorgias Press.
- Brunner, Kyle B. (2021). "Simeon of the Olives and his World: Life of the Khabur Basin during the early Islamic period". The Life of Simeon of the Olives: An Entrepreneurial Saint of Early Islamic North Mesopotamia. Gorgias Press LLC. ISBN 978-1-4632-4346-3.
- Comfort, Anthony Martin (14 May 2009). Roads on the frontier between Rome and Persia: Euphratesia, Osrhoene and Mesopotamia from AD 363 to 602 (Ph.D.). University of Exeter. hdl:10036/68213.
- Gaunt, David (2006). Massacres, Resistance, Protectors: Muslim-Christian Relations in Eastern Anatolia during World War I. Gorgias Press.
- Jongerden, Joost; Verheij, Jelle, eds. (2012). Social Relations in Ottoman Diyarbekir, 1870-1915. Brill.
- Crow, James (2018). "Sisauronon". In Nicholson, Oliver (ed.). The Oxford Dictionary of Late Antiquity. Oxford: Oxford University Press. ISBN 978-0-19-866277-8.
- Marciak, Michał (2017). Sophene, Gordyene, and Adiabene: Three Regna Minora of Northern Mesopotamia Between East and West. Brill. ISBN 978-90-04-35072-4.
- Nicholson, Oliver; Freeman, Philip (2018). "frontier, Roman military, eastern". In Nicholson, Oliver (ed.). The Oxford Dictionary of Late Antiquity. Oxford: Oxford University Press. ISBN 978-0-19-866277-8.
- Wiesehöfer, Josef; Canepa, Matthew (2018). "frontiers, Persian". In Nicholson, Oliver (ed.). The Oxford Dictionary of Late Antiquity. Oxford: Oxford University Press. ISBN 978-0-19-866277-8.
