= Odolgan =

Byzantine Hun commander

Odolgan (fl. 547) was a Hun commander serving under the Byzantine Empire. He was the commander of the garrison of Perugia.

During the war between the Ostrogoths and the Byzantines, a commander named Martinianos from Byzantion went to the Ostrogoth side pretending to be a deserter. He thus managed to recover his wife and one of his children from Totila. The Ostrogoths had captured Spoleto, razing the walls of the city to the ground. They walled up completely the walls of the arena, however, and established it as a garrison of both Ostrogoths and Roman deserters. Martinianos came to Spoleto and convinced 15 Roman deserters to return to the Romans, upon achieving a great feat against the Ostrogoths. He sent a message to commander of the garrison of Spoleto, Odolgan, explaining the situation and asking him to immediately send an army to him.

As Odolgan and his army approached, Martinianos and his fifteen suddenly slew the commander of the Spoleto garrison, opening the doors for Odolgan and his army, who entered the fortress. They killed most of the Ostrogoths, taking a few as prisoners to bring to Belisarius.

== Etymology ==
His name might be of Turkic origin.
