= Theotecnus =

Bishop in Roman Judea

Theotecnus was bishop of Caesarea Maritima in the late 3rd century.

Titles of the Great Christian Church
Preceded by Domnus	Bishop of Caesarea ?-c. 303	Succeeded by Agapius
