= Eusebius =

Greek Christian bishop and scholar (c. 260 – 339)

Saint Eusebius of Caesarea
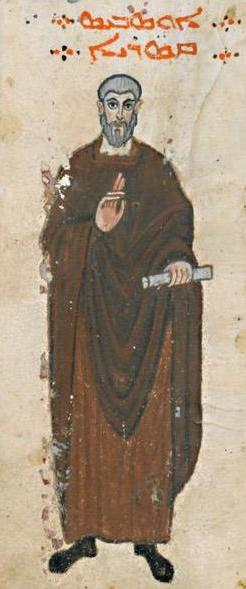
- 6th century Syriac portrait of St. Eusebius of Caesarea from the Rabbula Gospels

The Father of Church History
- Born: c. 260–265; Caesarea Palaestina, Syria Palaestina, Roman Empire
- Died: 30 May 339 (aged 74–79); Caesarea Palaestina, Syria Palaestina, Roman Empire
- Venerated in: Catholic Church (historically); Oriental Orthodox Church
- Feast: 30 May (ancient Syrian Church and Roman Catholic Church); 29 February (Syrian Orthodox); 21 June (Roman Catholic; Suppressed by Pope Gregory XIII)
- Influences: Origen, St. Pamphilus of Caesarea, St. Constantine the Great, Sextus Julius Africanus, Philo, Plato
- Influenced: St. Palladius of Galatia, St. Basil the Great, Rufinus of Aquileia, St. Theodoret of Cyrus, Socrates of Constantinople, Sozomen, Evagrius Scholasticus, Gelasius of Cyzicus, Michael the Syrian, St. Jerome, Philostorgius, Victorius of Aquitaine, St. Pope Gelasius I, Pope Pelagius II, Henri Valois, George Bull, William Cave, Samuel Lee, J.B. Lightfoot, Henry Wace
- Writing career
- Occupations: Bishop, historian, theologian
- Period: Constantinian dynasty
- Notable works: Ecclesiastical History, On the Life of Pamphilus, Chronicle, On the Martyrs

Eusebius of Caesarea (Note: /juːˈsiːbiəs/ yoo-SEE-bee-əs; Ancient Greek: Εὐσέβιος τῆς Καισαρείας, Eusébios tês Kaisareías) (c. AD 260/265 – 30 May AD 339), also known as Eusebius Pamphilius, (Note: from the Ancient Greek: Εὐσέβιος τοῦ Παμφίλου) was a historian of Christianity, exegete, and Christian polemicist from the Roman province of Syria Palaestina. In about AD 314 he became the bishop of Caesarea Palaestina.

Together with Pamphilus, Eusebius was a scholar of the biblical canon and is regarded as one of the most learned Christians during late antiquity. He wrote the Demonstrations of the Gospel, Preparations for the Gospel and On Discrepancies between the Gospels, studies of the biblical text. His work Onomasticon is an early geographical lexicon of places in the Holy Land mentioned in the Bible. As "Father of Church history" (Note: Eusebius is considered the first historian of Christianity.) (not to be confused with the title of Church Father), he produced the Ecclesiastical History, On the Life of Pamphilus, the Chronicle and On the Martyrs. He also produced a biographical work on Constantine the Great, the first Christian Roman emperor, who was Augustus between AD 306 and AD 337.

== Sources ==
Little is known about the life of Eusebius. His successor at the See of Caesarea, Acacius, wrote a Life of Eusebius, a work that has since been lost. Eusebius's own surviving works probably only represent a small portion of his total output. Beyond notices in his extant writings, the major sources are the 5th-century ecclesiastical historians Socrates, Sozomen, and Theodoret, and the 4th-century Christian author Jerome. There are assorted notices of his activities in the writings of his contemporaries Athanasius, Arius, Eusebius of Nicomedia, and Alexander of Alexandria. Eusebius's pupil, Eusebius of Emesa, provides some incidental information.

== Early life ==
Most scholars date the birth of Eusebius to some point between AD 260 and 265. He was most likely born in or around Caesarea Maritima. Nothing is known about his parents. He was baptized and instructed in the city, and lived in Syria Palaestina in 296, when Diocletian's army passed through the region (in the Life of Constantine, Eusebius recalls seeing Constantine traveling with the army).

Eusebius was made presbyter by Agapius of Caesarea. Some, like theologian and ecclesiastical historian John Henry Newman, understand Eusebius's statement that he had heard Dorotheus of Tyre "expound the Scriptures wisely in the Church" to indicate that Eusebius was Dorotheus's pupil while the priest was resident in Antioch; others, like the scholar D. S. Wallace-Hadrill, deem the phrase too ambiguous to support the contention.

Through the activities of the theologian Origen (185/6–254) and the school of his follower Pamphilus (later 3rd century – 309), Caesarea became a center of Christian learning. Origen was largely responsible for the collection of usage information, or which churches were using which gospels, regarding the texts which became the New Testament. The information used to create the late-fourth-century Easter Letter, which declared accepted Christian writings, was probably based on the Ecclesiastical History [HE] of Eusebius of Caesarea, wherein he uses the information passed on to him by Origen to create both his list at HE 3:25 and Origen's list at HE 6:25. Eusebius got his information about what texts were accepted by the third-century churches throughout the known world, a great deal of which Origen knew of firsthand from his extensive travels, from the library and writings of Origen.

On his deathbed, Origen had made a bequest of his private library to the Christian community in the city. Together with the books of his patron Ambrosius, Origen's library (including the original manuscripts of his works (Note: Pamphilus might not have obtained all of Origen's writings, however: the library's text of Origen's commentary on Isaiah broke off at 30:6, while the original commentary was said to have taken up thirty volumes.)) formed the core of the collection that Pamphilus established. Pamphilus also managed a school that was similar to (or perhaps a re-establishment of) that of Origen. He was compared to Demetrius of Phalerum—as well as to another (evidently, learnèd) scholar by the name of "Pisistratus" (Note: Apparently named after—but not to be confused with—the Athenian tyrant.)—for Pamphilus had gathered Bibles "from all parts of the world". Like his model Origen, Pamphilus maintained close contact with his students. Eusebius, in his history of the persecutions, alludes to the fact that many of the Caesarean martyrs lived together, presumably under Pamphilus.

Soon after Pamphilus settled in Caesarea (c. 280s), he began teaching Eusebius, who was then somewhere between twenty and twenty-five. Because of his close relationship with his schoolmaster, Eusebius was sometimes called Eusebius Pamphili: "Eusebius, son of Pamphilus". (Note: There are three interpretations of this term: (1) that Eusebius was the "spiritual son", or favored pupil, of Pamphilus; (2) that Eusebius was literally adopted by Pamphilus; and (3) that Eusebius was Pamphilus's biological son. The third explanation is the least popular among scholars. The scholion on the Preparation for the Gospels 1.3 in the Codex Paris. 451 is usually adduced in support of the thesis. Most reject the scholion as too late or misinformed, but E. H. Gifford, an editor and translator of the Preparation, believes it to have been written by Arethas, the tenth-century archbishop of Caesarea, who was in a position to know the truth of the matter.) The name may also indicate that Eusebius was made Pamphilus's heir. Pamphilus gave Eusebius a strong admiration for the thought of Origen. Neither Pamphilus nor Eusebius knew Origen personally; Pamphilus probably picked up Origenist ideas during his studies under Pierius (nicknamed "Origen Junior") in Alexandria.

Eusebius's Preparation for the Gospel bears witness to the literary tastes of Origen: Eusebius quotes no comedy, tragedy, or lyric poetry, but makes reference to all the works of Plato and to an extensive range of later philosophic works, largely from Middle Platonists from Philo to the late 2nd century. Whatever its secular contents, the primary aim of Origen and Pamphilus's school was to promote sacred learning. The library's biblical and theological contents were more impressive: Origen's Hexapla and Tetrapla; a copy of the original Aramaic version of the Gospel of Matthew; and many of Origen's own writings. Marginal comments in extant manuscripts note that Pamphilus and his friends and pupils, including Eusebius, corrected and revised much of the biblical text in their library. Their efforts made the hexaplaric Septuagint text increasingly popular in Syria and Palestine. Soon after joining Pamphilus's school, Eusebius started helping his master expand the library's collections and broaden access to its resources. At about this time Eusebius compiled a Collection of Ancient Martyrdoms, presumably for use as a general reference tool.

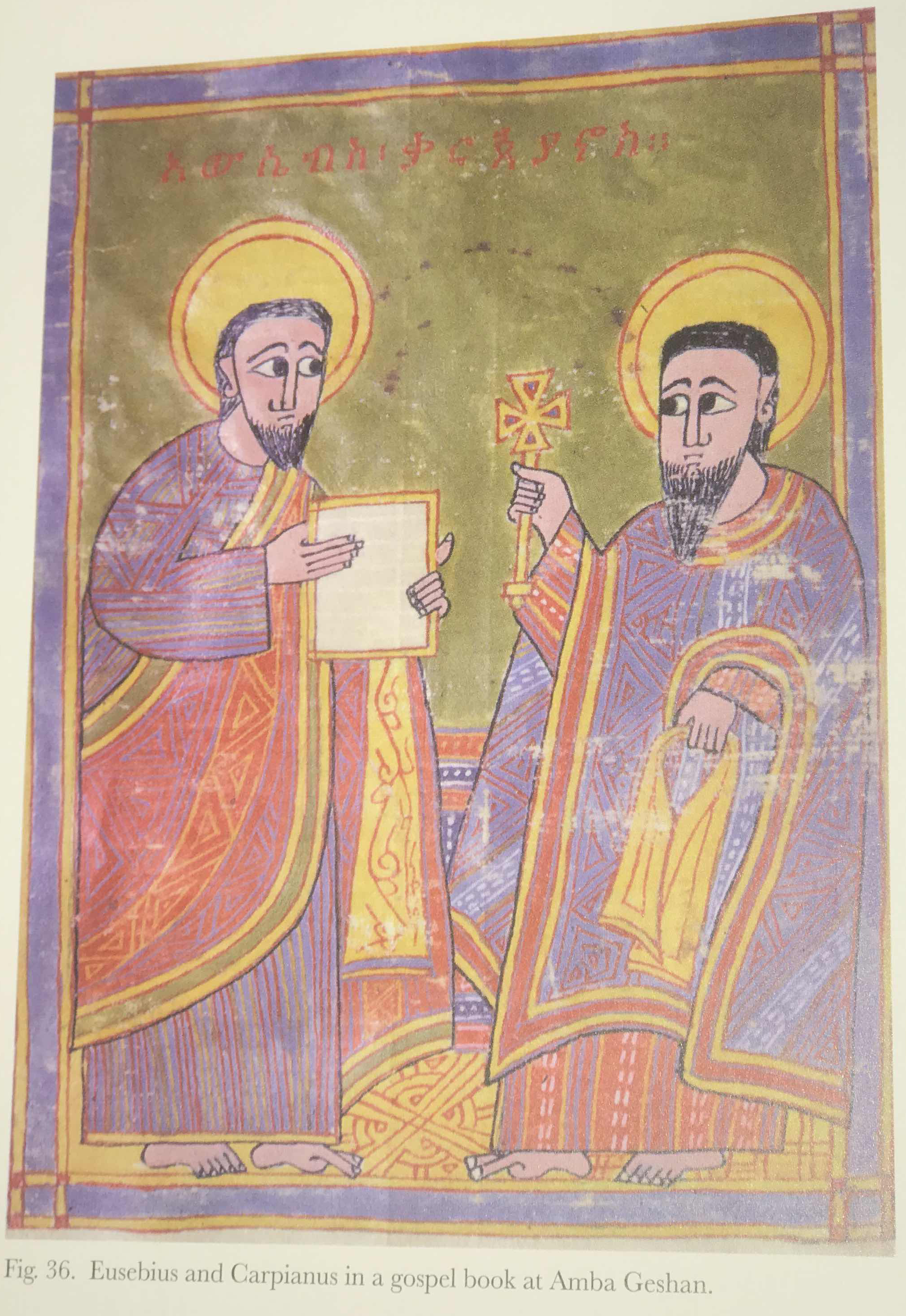
Eusebius of Caesarea and Carpianus depicted as Saints in a gospel book from monastery at Amba Geshan

In the 290s, Eusebius began work on his most important work, the Ecclesiastical History, a narrative history of the Church and Christian community from the Apostolic Age to Eusebius's own time. At about the same time, he worked on his Chronicle, a universal calendar of events from the Creation to, again, Eusebius's own time. He completed the first editions of the Ecclesiastical History and Chronicle before 300.

== Bishop of Caesarea ==
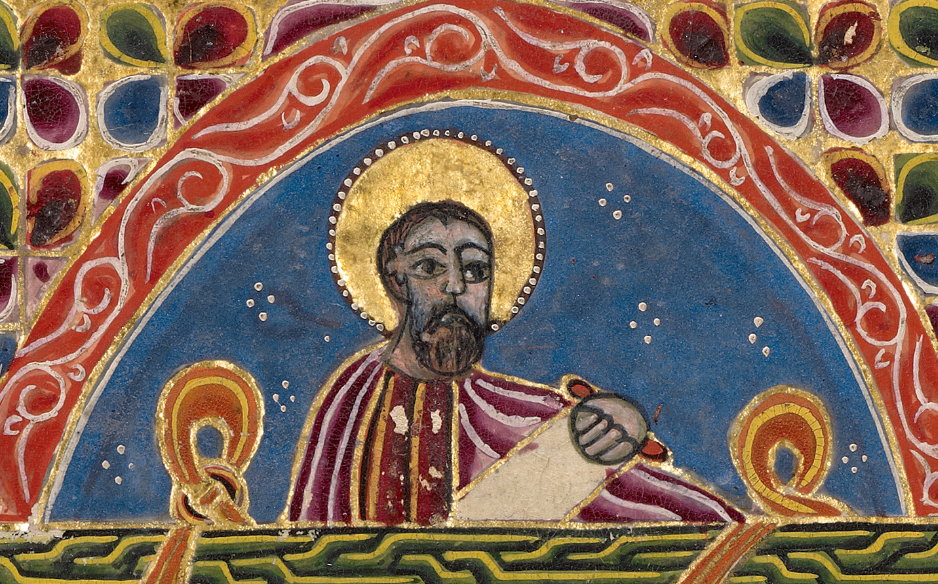
Icon of Eusebius of Caesarea as a Saint in Medieval Armenian Manuscript from Isfahan, Persia

Eusebius succeeded Agapius as Bishop of Caesarea soon after 313 and was called on by Arius who had been excommunicated by his bishop Alexander of Alexandria. An episcopal council in Caesarea pronounced Arius blameless. Eusebius enjoyed the favor of the Emperor Constantine. Because of this he was called upon to present the creed of his own church to the 318 attendees of the Council of Nicaea in 325. However, the anti-Arian creed from Palestine prevailed, becoming the basis for the Nicene Creed.

The theological views of Arius, that taught the subordination of the Son to the Father, continued to be controversial. Eustathius of Antioch strongly opposed the growing influence of Origen's theology as the root of Arianism. Eusebius, an admirer of Origen, was reproached by Eustathius for deviating from the Nicene faith. Eusebius prevailed and Eustathius was deposed at a synod in Antioch.

However, Athanasius of Alexandria became a more powerful opponent and in 334 he was summoned before a synod in Caesarea (which he refused to attend). In the following year, he was again summoned before a synod in Tyre at which Eusebius of Caesarea presided. Athanasius, foreseeing the result, went to Constantinople to bring his cause before the Emperor. Constantine called the bishops to his court, among them Eusebius. Athanasius was condemned and exiled at the end of 335. Eusebius remained in the Emperor's favour throughout this time and more than once was exonerated with the explicit approval of the Emperor Constantine. After the Emperor's death (c. 337), Eusebius wrote the Life of Constantine, an important historical work because of eyewitness accounts and the use of primary sources.

== Works ==
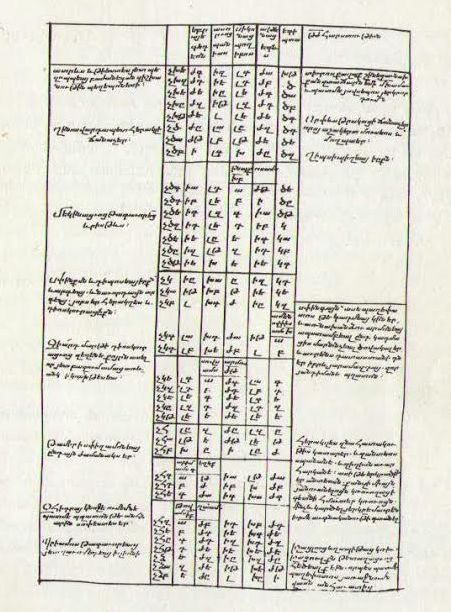
Armenian translation of Chronicon. 13th century manuscript.

Of the extensive literary activity of Eusebius, a relatively large portion has been preserved. Although posterity suspected him of Arianism, Eusebius had made himself indispensable by his method of authorship; his comprehensive and careful excerpts from original sources saved his successors the painstaking labor of original research. Hence, much has been preserved, quoted by Eusebius, which otherwise would have been lost.

The literary productions of Eusebius reflect on the whole the course of his life. At first, he occupied himself with works on biblical criticism under the influence of Pamphilus and probably of Dorotheus of Tyre of the School of Antioch. Afterward, the persecutions under Diocletian and Galerius directed his attention to the martyrs of his own time and the past, and this led him to the history of the whole Church and finally to the history of the world, which, to him, was only a preparation for ecclesiastical history.

Then followed the time of the Arian controversies, and dogmatic questions came into the foreground. Christianity at last found recognition by the State; and this brought new problems – apologies of a different sort had to be prepared. Lastly, Eusebius wrote eulogies in praise of Constantine. To all this activity must be added numerous writings of a miscellaneous nature, addresses, letters, and the like, and exegetical works that extended over the whole of his life and that include both commentaries and an important treatise on the location of biblical place names and the distances between these cities.

=== Biblical text criticism ===
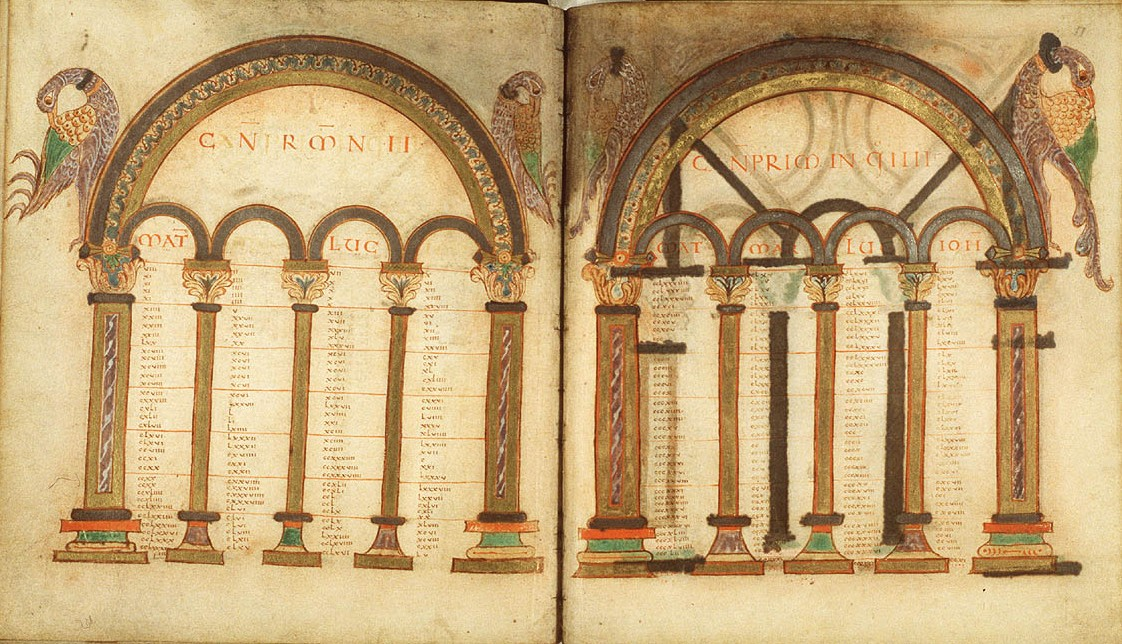
Eusebius's canon tables were often included in Early Medieval Gospel books.

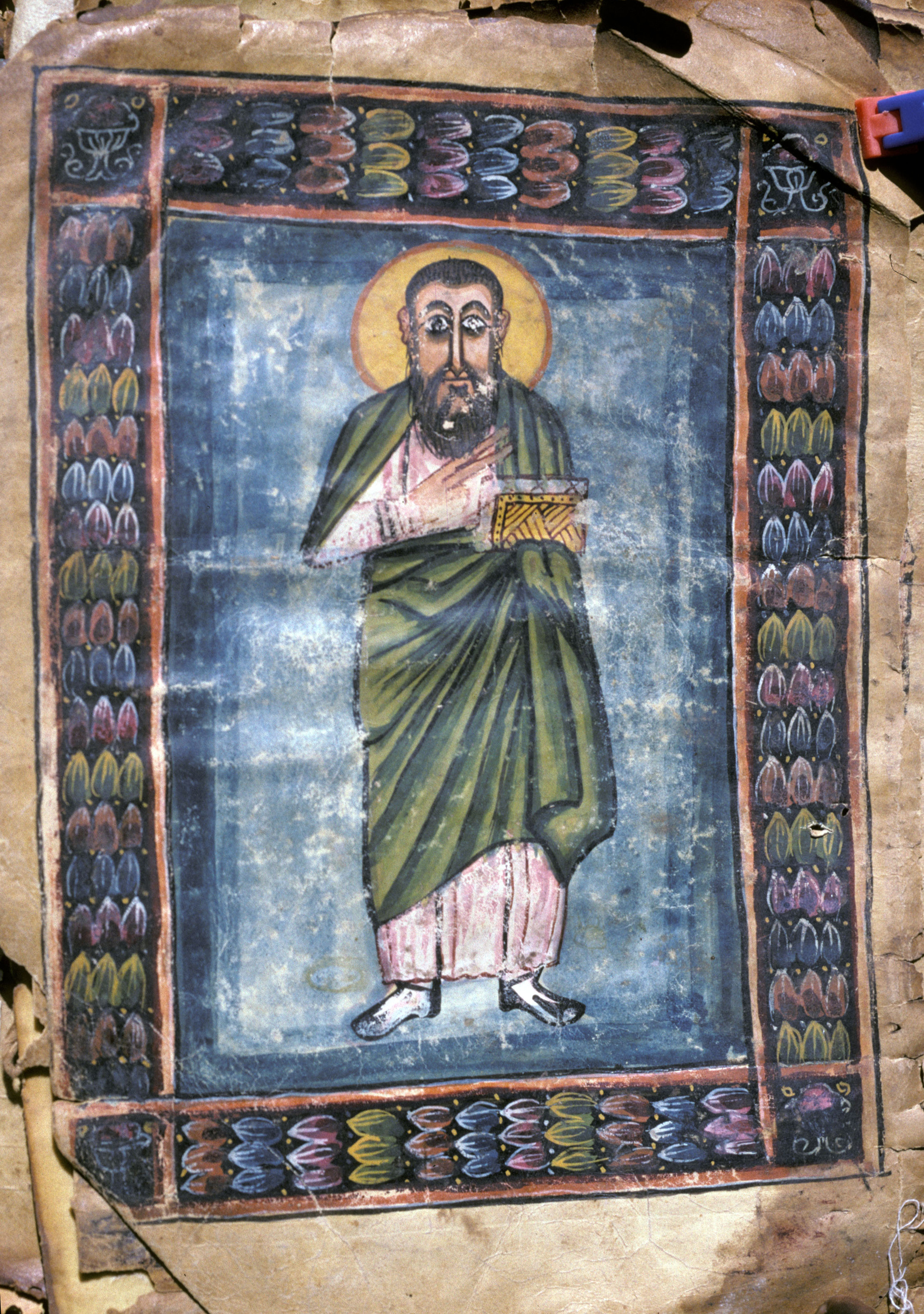
Eusebius depicted in the page preceding his Eusebian Canons in the ancient Garima Gospels

Pamphilus and Eusebius occupied themselves with the textual criticism of the Septuagint text of the Old Testament and especially of the New Testament. An edition of the Septuagint seems to have been already prepared by Origen, which, according to Jerome, was revised and circulated by Eusebius and Pamphilus. For an easier survey of the material of the four Evangelists, Eusebius divided his edition of the New Testament into paragraphs and provided it with a synoptical table so that it might be easier to find the pericopes that belong together. These canon tables or "Eusebian canons" remained in use throughout the Middle Ages, and illuminated manuscript versions are important for the study of early medieval art, as they are the most elaborately decorated pages of many Gospel books. Eusebius detailed in Epistula ad Carpianum how to use his canons.

=== Chronicle ===
The Chronicle (Παντοδαπὴ Ἱστορία (Pantodape historia)) is divided into two parts. The first part, the Chronography (Χρονογραφία (Chronographia)), gives an epitome of universal history from the sources, arranged according to nations. The second part, the Canons (Χρονικοὶ Κανόνες (Chronikoi kanones)), furnishes a synchronism of the historical material in parallel columns, the equivalent of a parallel timeline.

The work as a whole has been lost in the original Greek, but it may be reconstructed from later chronographists of the Byzantine school who made excerpts from the work, especially George Syncellus. The tables of the second part have been completely preserved in a Latin translation by Jerome, and both parts are still extant in an Armenian translation. The loss of the Greek originals has given the Armenian translation a special importance; thus, the first part of Eusebius's Chronicle, of which only a few fragments exist in Greek, has been preserved entirely in Armenian, though with lacunae. The Chronicle as preserved extends to the year 325.

=== Church History ===
In his Church History or Ecclesiastical History, Eusebius wrote the second surviving history of the Christian Church as a chronologically ordered account, based on earlier sources, complete from the period of the Apostles to his own epoch. The time scheme correlated the history with the reigns of the Roman Emperors, and the scope was broad. Included were the bishops and other teachers of the Church, Christian relations with the Jews and those deemed heretical, and the Christian martyrs through 324. Although its accuracy and biases have been questioned, it remains an important source on the early church due to Eusebius's access to materials now lost.

=== Life of Constantine ===
Eusebius's Life of Constantine (Vita Constantini) is a eulogy or panegyric, and therefore its style and selection of facts are affected by its purpose, rendering it inadequate as a continuation of the Church History. As the historian Socrates Scholasticus said, at the opening of his history which was designed as a continuation of Eusebius, "Also in writing the life of Constantine, this same author has but slightly treated of matters regarding Arius, being more intent on the rhetorical finish of his composition and the praises of the emperor than on an accurate statement of facts." The work was unfinished at Eusebius's death. Some scholars have questioned the Eusebian authorship of this work.

==== Conversion of Constantine according to Eusebius ====
Writing after Constantine had died, Eusebius claimed that the emperor himself had recounted to him that some time between the death of his father – the augustus Constantius – and his final battle against his rival Maxentius as augustus in the West, Constantine experienced a vision in which he and his soldiers beheld a Christian symbol, "a cross-shaped trophy formed from light", above the sun at midday. Attached to the symbol was the phrase "by this conquer" (ἐν τούτῳ νίκα, en toútōi níka), a phrase often rendered into Latin as "in hoc signo vinces". In a dream that night "the Christ of God appeared to him with the sign which had appeared in the sky, and urged him to make himself a copy of the sign which had appeared in the sky, and to use this as a protection against the attacks of the enemy." Eusebius relates that this happened "on a campaign he [Constantine] was conducting somewhere". It is unclear from Eusebius's description whether the shields were marked with a Christian cross or with a chi-rho, a staurogram, or another similar symbol.

The Latin text De mortibus persecutorum contains an early account of the 28 October 312 Battle of the Milvian Bridge written by Lactantius probably in 313, the year following the battle. Lactantius does not mention a vision in the sky but describes a revelatory dream on the eve of battle. Eusebius's work of that time, his Church History, also makes no mention of the vision. The Arch of Constantine, constructed in AD 315, neither depicts a vision nor any Christian insignia in its depiction of the battle. In his posthumous biography of Constantine, Eusebius agrees with Lactantius that Constantine received instructions in a dream to apply a Christian symbol as a device to his soldiers' shields, but unlike Lactantius and subsequent Christian tradition, Eusebius does not date the events to October 312 and does not connect Constantine's vision and dream-vision with the Battle of the Milvian Bridge.

=== Minor historical works ===
Before he compiled his church history, Eusebius edited a collection of martyrdoms of the earlier period and a biography of Pamphilus. The martyrology has not survived as a whole, but it has been preserved almost completely in parts. It contained:

- an epistle of the congregation of Smyrna concerning the martyrdom of Polycarp;
- the martyrdom of Pionius;
- the martyrdoms of Carpus, Papylus, and Agathonike;
- the martyrdoms in the congregations of Vienne and Lyon;
- the martyrdom of Apollonius.

Of the life of Pamphilus, only a fragment survives. A work on the martyrs of Palestine in the time of Diocletian was composed after 311; numerous fragments are scattered in legendaries which have yet to be collected. The life of Constantine was compiled after the death of the emperor and the election of his sons as Augusti (337). It is more a rhetorical eulogy on the emperor than a history but is of great value on account of numerous documents incorporated into it.

=== Apologetic and dogmatic works ===
To the class of apologetic and dogmatic works belong:

- The Apology for Origen, the first five books of which, according to the definite statement of Photius, were written by Pamphilus in prison, with the assistance of Eusebius. Eusebius added the sixth book after the death of Pamphilus. We possess only a Latin translation of the first book, made by Rufinus.
- A treatise against Hierocles (a Roman governor), in which Eusebius combated the former's glorification of Apollonius of Tyana in a work entitled A Truth-loving Discourse (Greek: Philalethes logos); in spite of manuscript attribution to Eusebius, however, it has been argued (by Thomas Hagg and more recently, Aaron Johnson) that this treatise "Against Hierocles" was written by someone other than Eusebius of Caesarea.
- Praeparatio evangelica (Preparation for the Gospel), commonly known by its Latin title, which attempts to prove the excellence of Christianity over every pagan religion and philosophy. The Praeparatio consists of fifteen books which have been completely preserved. Eusebius considered it an introduction to Christianity for pagans. But its value for many later readers is more because Eusebius studded this work with so many lively fragments from historians and philosophers which are nowhere else preserved. Here alone is preserved Pyrrho's translation of the Buddhist Three marks of existence upon which Pyrrho based Pyrrhonism. Here alone is a summary of the writings of the Phoenician priest Sanchuniathon of which the accuracy has been shown by the mythological accounts found on the Ugaritic tables. Here alone is the account from Diodorus Siculus's sixth book of Euhemerus's wondrous voyage to the island of Panchaea where Euhemerus purports to have found his true history of the gods. And here almost alone is preserved writings of the neo-Platonist philosopher Atticus along with so much else.
- Demonstratio evangelica (Proof of the Gospel) is closely connected to the Praeparatio and comprised originally twenty books of which ten have been completely preserved as well as a fragment of the fifteenth. Here Eusebius treats of the person of Jesus Christ. The work was probably finished before 311;
- Another work which originated in the time of the persecution, entitled Prophetic Extracts (Eclogae propheticae). It discusses in four books the Messianic texts of Scripture. The work is merely the surviving portion (books 6–9) of the General elementary introduction to the Christian faith, now lost. The fragments given as the Commentary on Luke in the PG have been claimed to derive from the missing tenth book of the General Elementary Introduction (see D. S. Wallace-Hadrill); however, Aaron Johnson has argued that they cannot be associated with this work.

- The treatise On Divine Manifestation or On the Theophania (Peri theophaneias), of unknown date. It treats of the incarnation of the Divine Logos, and its contents are in many cases identical with the Demonstratio evangelica. Only fragments are preserved in Greek, but a complete Syriac translation of the Theophania survives in an early 5th-century manuscript. Samuel Lee, the editor (1842) and translator (1843) of the Syriac Theophania, thought that the work must have been written "after the general peace restored to the Church by Constantine, and before either the 'Praeparatio,' or the 'Demonstratio Evangelica,' was written ... It appears probable ... therefore, that this was one of the first productions of Eusebius, if not the first after the persecutions ceased." Hugo Gressmann, noting in 1904 that the Demonstratio seems to be mentioned at IV. 37 and V. 1, and that II. 14 seems to mention the extant practice of temple prostitution at Hieropolis in Phoenica, concluded that the Theophania was probably written shortly after 324. Others have suggested a date as late as 337.
- A polemical treatise against Marcellus of Ancyra, the Against Marcellus, dating from about 337;
- A supplement to the last-named work, also against Marcellus, entitled Ecclesiastical Theology, in which he defended the Nicene doctrine of the Logos against the party of Athanasius.

A number of writings, belonging in this category, have been entirely lost.

=== Exegetical and miscellaneous works ===
All of the exegetical works of Eusebius have suffered damage in transmission. The majority of them are known to us only from long portions quoted in Byzantine catena-commentaries. However these portions are very extensive. Extant are:

- An enormous Commentary on the Psalms;
- A commentary on Isaiah, discovered more or less complete in a manuscript in Florence early in the 20th century and published 50 years later;
- Small fragments of commentaries on Romans and 1 Corinthians.

Eusebius also wrote a work 'Quaestiones ad Stephanum et Marinum, On the Differences of the Gospels (including solutions). This was written for the purpose of harmonizing the contradictions in the reports of the different Evangelists. This work was recently (2011) translated into the English language by David J. Miller and Adam C. McCollum and was published under the name Eusebius of Caesarea: Gospel Problems and Solutions. The original work was also translated into Syriac, and lengthy quotations exist in a catena in that language, and also in Arabic catenas.

Eusebius also wrote treatises on the biblical past; these three treatises have been lost. They were:

- A work on the Greek equivalents of Hebrew Gentilic nouns;
- A description of old Judea with an account of the loss of the ten tribes;
- A plan of Jerusalem and the Temple of Solomon.

The addresses and sermons of Eusebius are mostly lost, but some have been preserved, e.g., a sermon on the consecration of the church in Tyre and an address on the thirtieth anniversary of the reign of Constantine (336).

Most of Eusebius's letters are lost. His letters to Carpianus and Flacillus exist complete. Fragments of a letter to the empress Constantia also exists.

== Doctrine ==
Eusebius is fairly unusual in his preterist, or fulfilled, eschatological view. Saying "the Holy Scriptures foretell that there will be unmistakable signs of the Coming of Christ. Now there were among the Hebrews three outstanding offices of dignity, which made the nation famous, firstly the kingship, secondly that of prophet, and lastly the high priesthood. The prophecies said that the abolition and complete destruction of all these three together would be the sign of the presence of the Christ. And that the proofs that the times had come, would lie in the ceasing of the Mosaic worship, the desolation of Jerusalem and its Temple, and the subjection of the whole Jewish race to its enemies. ...The holy oracles foretold that all these changes, which had not been made in the days of the prophets of old, would take place at the coming of the Christ, which I will presently shew to have been fulfilled as never before in accordance with the predictions" (Demonstratio Evangelica VIII).

From a dogmatic point of view, Eusebius is related in his views to Origen. Like Origen, he started from the fundamental thought of the absolute sovereignty (monarchia) of God. God is the cause of all beings. But he is not merely a cause; in him everything good is included, from him all life originates, and he is the source of all virtue. God sent Christ into the world that it may partake of the blessings included in the essence of God. Eusebius expressly distinguishes the Son as distinct from Father as a ray is also distinct from its source the sun.

Eusebius held that men were sinners by their own free choice and not by the necessity of their natures. Eusebius said:

The Creator of all things has impressed a natural law upon the soul of every man, as an assistant and ally in his conduct, pointing out to him the right way by this law; but, by the free liberty with which he is endowed, making the choice of what is best worthy of praise and acceptance, he has acted rightly, not by force, but from his own free-will, when he had it in his power to act otherwise, As, again, making him who chooses what is worst, deserving of blame and punishment, because he has by his own motion neglected the natural law, and becoming the origin and fountain of wickedness, and misusing himself, not from any extraneous necessity, but from free will and judgment. The fault is in him who chooses, not in God. For God has not made nature or the substance of the soul bad; for he who is good can make nothing but what is good. Everything is good which is according to nature. Every rational soul has naturally a good free-will, formed for the choice of what is good. But when a man acts wrongly, nature is not to be blamed; for what is wrong, takes place not according to nature, but contrary to nature, it being the work of choice, and not of nature.

A letter Eusebius is supposed to have written to Constantine's daughter Constantina, refusing to fulfill her request for images of Christ, was quoted in the decrees (now lost) of the Iconoclast Council of Hieria in 754, and later quoted in part in the rebuttal of the Hieria decrees in the Second Council of Nicaea of 787, now the only source from which some of the text is known. The authenticity or authorship of the letter remains uncertain.

=== Nicene Creed ===
In the June 2002 issue of the Church History journal, Pier Franco Beatrice reports that Eusebius testified that the word homoousios (consubstantial) "was inserted in the Nicene Creed solely by the personal order of Constantine."

According to Eusebius of Caesarea, the word homoousios was inserted in the Nicene Creed solely by the personal order of Constantine. But this statement is highly problematic. It is very difficult to explain the seeming paradoxical fact that this word, along with the explanation given by Constantine, was accepted by the "Arian" Eusebius, whereas it has left no traces at all in the works of his opponents, the leaders of the anti-Arian party such as Alexander of Alexandria, Ossius of Cordova, Marcellus of Ancyra, and Eustathius of Antioch, who are usually considered Constantine's theological advisers and the strongest supporters of the council. Neither before nor during Constantine's time is there any evidence of a normal, well-established Christian use of the term homoousios in its strictly Trinitarian meaning. Having once excluded any relationship of the Nicene homoousios with the Christian tradition, it becomes legitimate to propose a new explanation, based on an analysis of two pagan documents which have so far never been taken into account. The main thesis of this paper is that homoousios came straight from Constantine's Hermetic background. As can be clearly seen in the Poimandres, and even more clearly in an inscription mentioned exclusively in the Theosophia, in the theological language of Egyptian paganism the word homoousios meant that the Nous-Father and the Logos-Son, who are two distinct beings, share the same perfection of the divine nature.

— Pier Franco Beatrice, "The Word 'Homoousios' from Hellenism to Christianity", Church History, Volume 71, № 2, June 2002, p. 243

However, the council evidently did not force the insertion of the word and instead adopted a text related to the confession of Jerusalem. The role of Constantine remained uncertain during the council.

== Assessment ==
- Socrates Scholasticus (a 5th-century Christian historian), writing in his own Church History, criticized the Life of Constantine, stating that Eusebius was "more intent on the rhetorical finish of his composition and the praises of the emperor, than on an accurate statement of facts".
- Edward Gibbon openly distrusted the writings of Eusebius concerning the number of martyrs, by noting a passage in the shorter text of the Martyrs of Palestine attached to the Ecclesiastical History (Book 8, Chapter 2) in which Eusebius introduces his description of the martyrs of the Great Persecution under Diocletian with: "Wherefore we have decided to relate nothing concerning them except the things in which we can vindicate the Divine judgment. ... We shall introduce into this history in general only those events which may be useful first to ourselves and afterwards to posterity." In the longer text of the same work, chapter 12, Eusebius states: "I think it best to pass by all the other events which occurred in the meantime: such as ... the lust of power on the part of many, the disorderly and unlawful ordinations, and the schisms among the confessors themselves; also the novelties which were zealously devised against the remnants of the Church by the new and factious members, who added innovation after innovation and forced them in unsparingly among the calamities of the persecution, heaping misfortune upon misfortune. I judge it more suitable to shun and avoid the account of these things, as I said at the beginning."
- When his own honesty was challenged by his contemporaries, Gibbon appealed to a chapter heading in Eusebius's Praeparatio evangelica (Book XII, Chapter 31) in which Eusebius represents Plato as saying "that it will be necessary sometimes to use falsehood as a remedy for the benefit of those who require such a mode of treatment."
- Although Gibbon refers to Eusebius as the "gravest" of the ecclesiastical historians, he also suggests that Eusebius was more concerned with the passing political concerns of his time than with his duty as a reliable historian.
- Jacob Burckhardt (19th century cultural historian) dismissed Eusebius as "the first thoroughly dishonest historian of antiquity".
- Other critics of Eusebius's work cite the panegyrical tone of the Vita, plus the omission of internal Christian conflicts in the Canones, as reasons to interpret his writing with caution.

Alternate views have suggested that Gibbon's dismissal of Eusebius is inappropriate:

- With reference to Gibbon's comments, Joseph Barber Lightfoot (late 19th century theologian and former Bishop of Durham) pointed out that Eusebius's statements indicate his honesty in stating what he was not going to discuss, and also his limitations as a historian in not including such material. He also discusses the question of accuracy. "The manner in which Eusebius deals with his very numerous quotations elsewhere, where we can test his honesty, is a sufficient vindication against this unjust charge." Lightfoot also notes that Eusebius cannot always be relied on: "A far more serious drawback to his value as a historian is the loose and uncritical spirit in which he sometimes deals with his materials. This shows itself in diverse ways. He is not always to be trusted in his discrimination of genuine and spurious documents."
- Averil Cameron (professor at King's College London and Oxford) and Stuart Hall (historian and theologian), in their translation of the Life of Constantine, point out that writers such as Burckhardt found it necessary to attack Eusebius to undermine the ideological legitimacy of the Habsburg empire, which based itself on the idea of Christian empire derived from Constantine, and that the most controversial letter in the Life has since been found among the papyri of Egypt.
- In Church History (Vol. 59, 1990), Michael J. Hollerich (assistant professor at the Jesuit Santa Clara University, California) replies to Burckhardt's criticism of Eusebius, that "Eusebius has been an inviting target for students of the Constantinian era. At one time or another they have characterized him as a political propagandist, a good courtier, the shrewd and worldly adviser of the Emperor Constantine, the great publicist of the first Christian emperor, the first in a long succession of ecclesiastical politicians, the herald of Byzantinism, a political theologian, a political metaphysician, and a caesaropapist. It is obvious that these are not, in the main, neutral descriptions. Much traditional scholarship, sometimes with barely suppressed disdain, has regarded Eusebius as one who risked his orthodoxy and perhaps his character because of his zeal for the Constantinian establishment." Hollerich concludes that "the standard assessment has exaggerated the importance of political themes and political motives in Eusebius's life and writings and has failed to do justice to him as a churchman and a scholar".

While many have shared Burckhardt's assessment, particularly with reference to the Life of Constantine, others, while not pretending to extol his merits, have acknowledged the irreplaceable value of his works which may principally reside in the copious quotations that they contain from other sources, often lost.

== Veneration ==
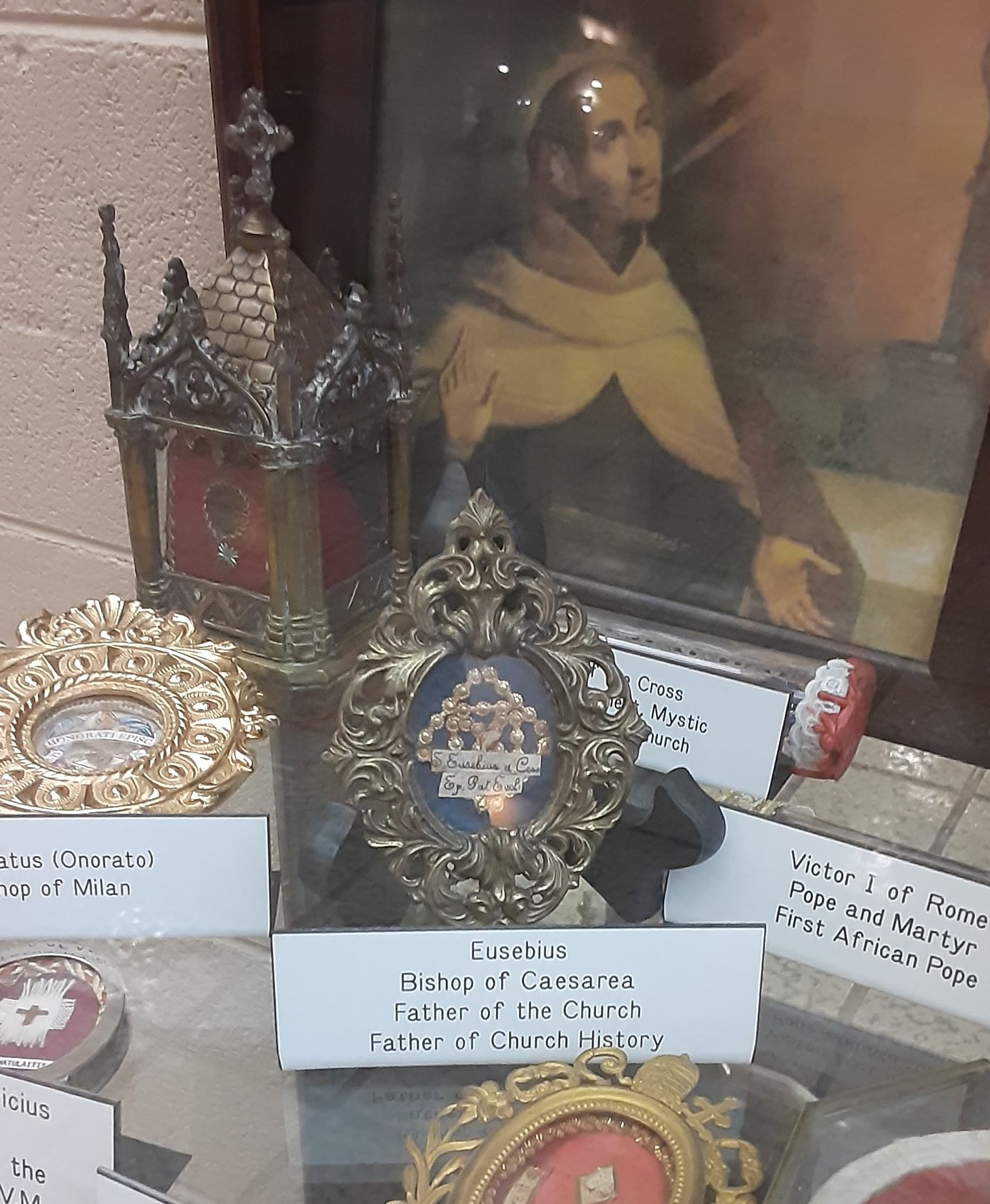
Relic of St. Eusebius of Caesarea from the Shrine of All Saints in St. Martha's Catholic Church in Morton Grove, Illinois

The earliest recorded feast day of Eusebius is found in the earliest known Syrian Martyrology dating to the year 411 translated by William Wright. The Martyrology lists his feast day as 30 May. Eusebius continues to be venerated as a Saint by the modern-day Syrian Orthodox Church as well, with a feast day on 29 February according to the official calendar of Saints created by Corbishop Rajan Achen.

Eusebius's status as a saint in the Catholic Church is at least unclear. He is listed in the Sacrae theologiae summa expressly as an 'ecclesiastical writer,' defined in contrast to Church Fathers as those writers in whom might be found "orthodoxy recognized by the Church, but no holiness or antiquity."

Bishop J. B. Lightfoot writes in his entry for Eusebius in Henry Wace's Dictionary of Christian Biography and Literature to the End of the Sixth Century AD, with an Account of Principal Sects and Heresies (1911) that "in the Martyrologium Romanum itself he held his place for centuries" and in "Gallican service-books the historian is commemorated as a saint." However, Lightfoot notes that in "the revision of this Martyrology under Gregory XIII his name was struck out, and Eusebius of Samosata was substituted, under the mistaken idea that Caesarea had been substituted for Samosata by a mistake." The Roman Catholic author Henri Valois includes in his translations on Eusebius's writings testimonies of ancient authors in favor and against Eusebius; in the former category he includes evidence of Eusebius in several martyrologies and being entitled "Blessed" dating back to Victorius of Aquitaine. Valois includes both Usuardus and Notker, who list his feast as 21 June in the Roman Martyrology, and a Gallican breviary is included for 21 June that reads as follows:

Of the holy Eusebius, bishop and confessor.

Lesson 1. Eusebius, bishop of Cæsarea in Palestine, on account of his friendship with Pamphilus the martyr, took from him the surname of Pamphili; inasmuch as along with this same Pamphilus he was a most diligent investigator of sacred literature. The man indeed is very worthy of being remembered in these times, both for his skill in many things, and for his wonderful genius, and by both Gentiles and Christians he was held distinguished and most noble among philosophers. This man, after having for a time labored in behalf of the Arian heresy, coming to the council of Nicæa, inspired by the Holy Spirit, followed the decision of the Fathers, and thereafter up to the time of his death lived in a most holy manner in the orthodox faith.

Lesson 2. He was, moreover, very zealous in the study of the sacred Scriptures, and along with Pamphilus the martyr was a most diligent investigator of sacred literature. At the same time he has written many things, but especially the following books: The Præparatio Evangelica, the Ecclesiastical History, Against Porphyry, a very bitter enemy of the Christians; he has also composed Six Apologies in Behalf of Origen, a Life of Pamphilus the Martyr, from whom on account of friendship he took his surname, in three books; likewise very learned Commentaries on the hundred and fifty Psalms.

Lesson 3. Moreover, as we read, after having ascertained the sufferings of many holy martyrs in all the provinces, and the lives of confessors and virgins, he has written concerning these saints twenty books; while on account of these books therefore, and especially on account of his Præparatio Evangelica, he was held most distinguished among the Gentiles, because of his love of truth he contemned the ancestral worship of the gods. He has written also a Chronicle, extending from the first year of Abraham up to the year 300 AD, which the divine Hieronymus has continued. Finally this Eusebius, after the conversion of Constantine the Great, was united to him by strong friendship as long as he lived.

A bone fragment relic of Eusebius within its original reliquary is on display at the Shrine of All Saints located within St. Martha's Catholic Church in Morton Grove, Illinois.

Nevertheless, the Church's official stance today remains that he is not canonized.

== Bibliography ==
- Eusebius of Caesarea.
  - Historia Ecclesiastica (Church History) first seven books c. 300, eighth and ninth book c. 313, tenth book c. 315, epilogue c. 325.
    - Migne, J. P., ed. Eusebiou tou Pamphilou, episkopou tes en Palaistine Kaisareias ta euriskomena panta (in Greek). Patrologia Graeca 19–24. Paris, 1857. Online at Khazar Skeptik Archived 28 December 2009 at the Wayback Machine and Documenta Catholica Omnia. Accessed 4 November 2009.
    - McGiffert, Arthur Cushman, trans. Church History. From Nicene and Post-Nicene Fathers, Second Series, Vol. 1. Edited by Philip Schaff and Henry Wace. Buffalo, NY: Christian Literature Publishing Co., 1890. Revised and edited for New Advent by Kevin Knight. Online at New Advent and CCEL. Accessed 28 September 2009.
    - Williamson, G. A., trans. Church History. London: Penguin, 1989.
  - Contra Hieroclem (Against Hierocles).
  - Onomasticon (On the Place-Names in Holy Scripture).
    - Klostermann, E., ed. Eusebius' Werke 3.1 (Die griechischen christlichen Schrifsteller der ersten (drei) Jahrhunderte 11.1. Leipzig and Berlin, 1904). Online at the Internet Archive. Accessed 29 January 2010.
    - Wolf, Umhau, trans. The Onomasticon of Eusebius Pamphili: Compared with the version of Jerome and annotated. Washington, D.C.: Catholic University of America Press, 1971. Online at Tertullian. Accessed 29 January 2010.
    - Taylor, Joan E., ed. Palestine in the Fourth Century. The Onomasticon by Eusebius of Caesarea, translated by Greville Freeman-Grenville, and indexed by Rupert Chapman III (Jerusalem: Carta, 2003).
  - De Martyribus Palestinae (On the Martyrs of Palestine).
    - McGiffert, Arthur Cushman, trans. Martyrs of Palestine. From Nicene and Post-Nicene Fathers, Second Series, Vol. 1. Edited by Philip Schaff and Henry Wace. Buffalo, NY: Christian Literature Publishing Co., 1890. Revised and edited for New Advent by Kevin Knight. Online at New Advent and CCEL. Accessed 2009-06-09.
    - Cureton, William, trans. History of the Martyrs in Palestine by Eusebius of Caesarea, Discovered in a Very Antient Syriac Manuscript. London: Williams & Norgate, 1861. Online at Tertullian. Accessed 28 September 2009.
  - Praeparatio Evangelica (Preparation for the Gospel).
  - Demonstratio Evangelica (Demonstration of the Gospel).
  - Theophania (Theophany).
  - Laudes Constantini (In Praise of Constantine) 335.
    - Migne, J. P., ed. Eusebiou tou Pamphilou, episkopou tes en Palaistine Kaisareias ta euriskomena panta (in Greek). Patrologia Graeca 19–24. Paris, 1857. Online at Khazar Skeptik Archived 28 December 2009 at the Wayback Machine. Accessed 4 November 2009.
    - Richardson, Ernest Cushing, trans. Oration in Praise of Constantine. From Nicene and Post-Nicene Fathers, Second Series, Vol. 1. Edited by Philip Schaff and Henry Wace. Buffalo, NY: Christian Literature Publishing Co., 1890. Revised and edited for New Advent by Kevin Knight. Online at New Advent. Accessed 2009-10-19.
  - Vita Constantini (The Life of the Blessed Emperor Constantine) ca. 336–39.
    - Migne, J. P., ed. Eusebiou tou Pamphilou, episkopou tes en Palaistine Kaisareias ta euriskomena panta (in Greek). Patrologia Graeca 19–24. Paris, 1857. Online at Khazar Skeptik Archived 28 December 2009 at the Wayback Machine.
    - Richardson, Ernest Cushing, trans. Life of Constantine. From Nicene and Post-Nicene Fathers, Second Series, Vol. 1. Edited by Philip Schaff and Henry Wace. Buffalo, NY: Christian Literature Publishing Co., 1890. Revised and edited for New Advent by Kevin Knight. Online at New Advent.
    - Cameron, Averil and Stuart Hall, trans. Life of Constantine. New York: Oxford University Press, 1999.
- Gregory Thaumaturgus. Oratio Panegyrica.
  - Salmond, S. D. F., trans. From Ante-Nicene Fathers, Vol. 6. Edited by Alexander Roberts, James Donaldson, and A. Cleveland Coxe. Buffalo, NY: Christian Literature Publishing Co., 1886. Revised and edited for New Advent by Kevin Knight. Online at New Advent. Accessed 2010-01-31.
- Jerome.
  - Chronicon (Chronicle) ca. 380.
    - Fotheringham, John Knight, ed. The Bodleian Manuscript of Jerome's Version of the Chronicle of Eusebius. Oxford: Clarendon, 1905. Online at the Internet Archive. Accessed 8 October 2009.
    - Pearse, Roger, et al., trans. The Chronicle of St. Jerome, in Early Church Fathers: Additional Texts. Tertullian, 2005. Online at Tertullian. Accessed 14 August 2009.
  - de Viris Illustribus (On Illustrious Men) 392.
    - Herding, W., ed. De Viris Illustribus (in Latin). Leipzig: Teubner, 1879. Online at Internet Archive. Accessed 6 October 2009.
    - Liber de viris inlustribus (in Latin). Texte und Untersuchungen 14. Leipzig, 1896.
    - Richardson, Ernest Cushing, trans. De Viris Illustribus (On Illustrious Men). From Nicene and Post-Nicene Fathers, Second Series, Vol. 3. Edited by Philip Schaff and Henry Wace. Buffalo, NY: Christian Literature Publishing Co., 1892. Revised and edited for New Advent by Kevin Knight. Online at New Advent. 2009-08-15.
  - Epistulae (Letters).
    - Fremantle, W. H., G. Lewis and W. G. Martley, trans. Letters. From Nicene and Post-Nicene Fathers, Second Series, Vol. 6. Edited by Philip Schaff and Henry Wace. Buffalo, NY: Christian Literature Publishing Co., 1893. Revised and edited for New Advent by Kevin Knight. Online at New Advent and CCEL. Accessed 2009-10-19.
- Origen.
  - De Principiis (On First Principles).

== See also ==
- Church Fathers
- Constantine I and Christianity
- Early Christianity
- Fifty Bibles of Constantine
- 4th century in Lebanon
- Travelogues of Palestine

== Notes ==
Titles of the Great Christian Church
Preceded by Agapius	Bishop of Caesarea c. 313–339	Succeeded by Acacius
