= Agapius of Caesarea =

Agapius of Caesarea was bishop of Caesarea Maritima from 303 to c. 312. He may have baptized and trained Eusebius, who was to become his successor.

Titles of the Great Christian Church
Preceded by Theotecnus	Bishop of Caesarea c. 303–c. 312	Succeeded by Eusebius
