= Caesarea Maritima =

Ancient Levantine city

Caesarea
- Καισάρεια / قيصرية / קיסריה
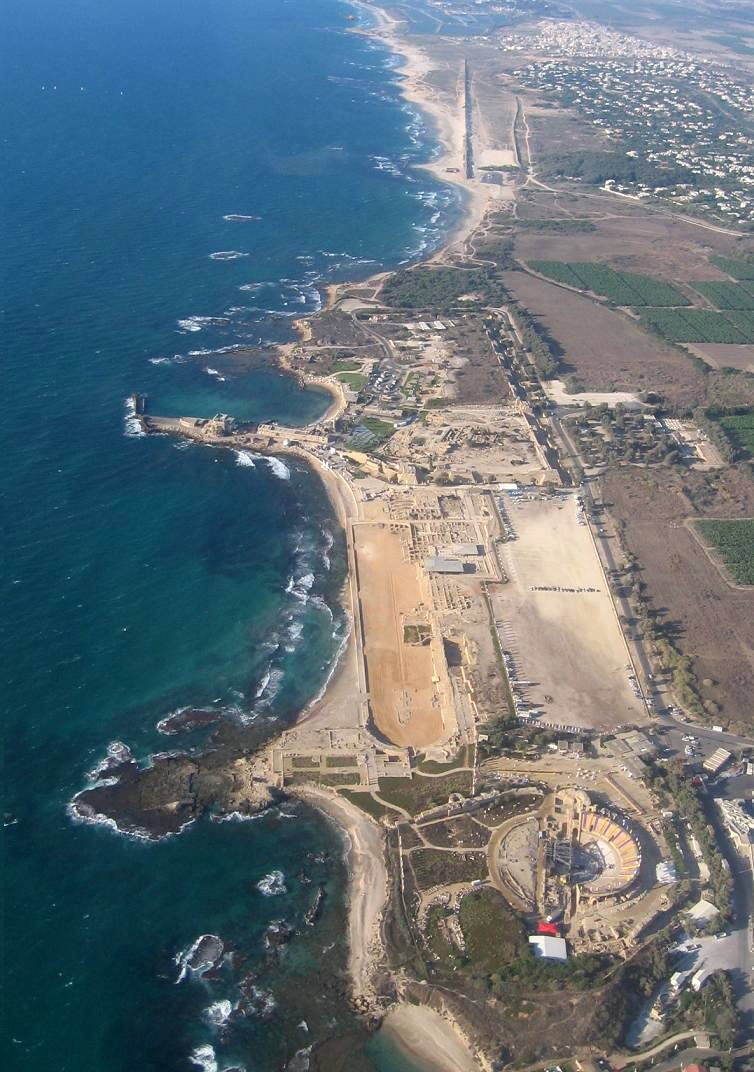
- The ruins of Caesarea Maritima, with the modern resort town of Caesarea (Keisarya) shown in the top right

- Location within Israel
- 32°30′0″N 34°53′30″E
- Type: Settlement
- Periods: Classical antiquity to High Middle Ages
- Cultures: Phoenician, Roman, Byzantine
- Location: Caesarea National Park, Hof HaCarmel Regional Council, Israel
- Region: Sharon plain
- Part of: Roman Judea, Syria Palaestina

History
- Built: 4th century BCE
- Built by: Abdashtart I
- Abandoned: 1265

Site notes
- Management: Israel Nature and Parks Authority
- Public access: Yes

Caesarea (/ˌsɛzəˈriːə, ˌsɛs-, ˌsiːz-/), (Note: SE(E)Z-ə-REE-ə, SESS-; Koine Greek: Καισάρεια, romanized: Kaisáreia; Hebrew: קֵיסָרְיָה, romanized: Qēsāryā; Arabic: قَيْصَرِيَّة, romanized: Qayṣariyyah or Arabic: قيسارية or Arabic: قيساريا)) also Caesarea Maritima, Caesarea Palaestinae or Caesarea Stratonis, (Note: While the name Caesarea was frequently used alone, various suffixes were also used to disambiguate it from the other cities in the Roman Empire that were also known as Caesarea. Caesarea-Palaestinae was the most common of these in the ancient texts, but fell out of use in contemporary academic literature in favor of Caesarea Maritima.) was an ancient and medieval port city on the coast of the eastern Mediterranean, and later a small fishing village. It was the capital of Roman Judaea, Syria Palaestina and Palaestina Prima, successively, for a period of c. 650 years and a major intellectual hub of the Mediterranean. Today, the site is part of the Caesarea National Park, on the western edge of the Sharon plain in Israel.

The site was first settled in the 4th century BCE as a Phoenician colony and trading village known as Straton's Tower after the ruler of Sidon. It was enlarged in the 1st century BCE under Hasmonean rule, becoming a Jewish village; and in 63 BCE, when the Roman Republic annexed the region, it was declared an autonomous city. It was then significantly enlarged in the Roman period by the Judaean client King Herod the Great, who established a harbour and dedicated the town and its port to Caesar Augustus as Caesarea.

During the early Roman period, Caesarea became the seat of the Roman procurators in the region. The city was populated throughout the 1st to 6th centuries CE and became an important early centre of Christianity during the Byzantine period. Its importance may have waned following the Muslim conquest of 640 when the city, then known in Arabic as Qisarya (قيسارية), lost its status as provincial capital. After being re-fortified by Muslim rulers in the 11th century, it was conquered by the Crusaders, who strengthened and made it into an important port, which was finally slighted by the Mamluks in 1265.

Qisarya was a small fishing village in the early modern period. In February 1948, during the 1948 Palestine war and Nakba, some of its population fled following an attack on a bus by the Zionist militant group Lehi, and the remainder were expelled by the Palmach, who subsequently demolished its houses. The ruins of the ancient city beneath the depopulated village were excavated in the 1950s and 1960s for archaeological purposes.

== Name ==
Whilst the name Caesarea was frequently used alone for the subject of this article, various markers were used to differentiate the location from these other locations; these include "Palaestina" ("of Palestine"), "Maritima" ("by the sea"; Greek: Παράλιος Parálios), "Sebaste" and "Stratonis". "Palaestina" is the most common term used in ancient sources, but, since the creation of Israel in 1948, historians in the West have tended to use the term less frequently.

The Latin name Caesarea also referred to several other cities in the region, notably Caesarea near Mount Hermon and Caesarea the capital of Cappadocia.

== History ==
=== Straton's Tower ===
Stratonos pyrgos (Straton's Tower) was founded in the 4th century BCE by Abdashtart I, or Straton I king of Sidon. It was first established as a Phoenician colony and trading village. In 90 BCE, Jewish ruler Alexander Jannaeus captured Straton's Tower as part of his policy of developing the shipbuilding industry and enlarging the Hasmonean kingdom. Straton's Tower remained a Jewish settlement for two more generations, until the area became dominated by the Romans in 63 BCE, when they declared it an autonomous city.

=== Herod the Great builds Caesarea ===
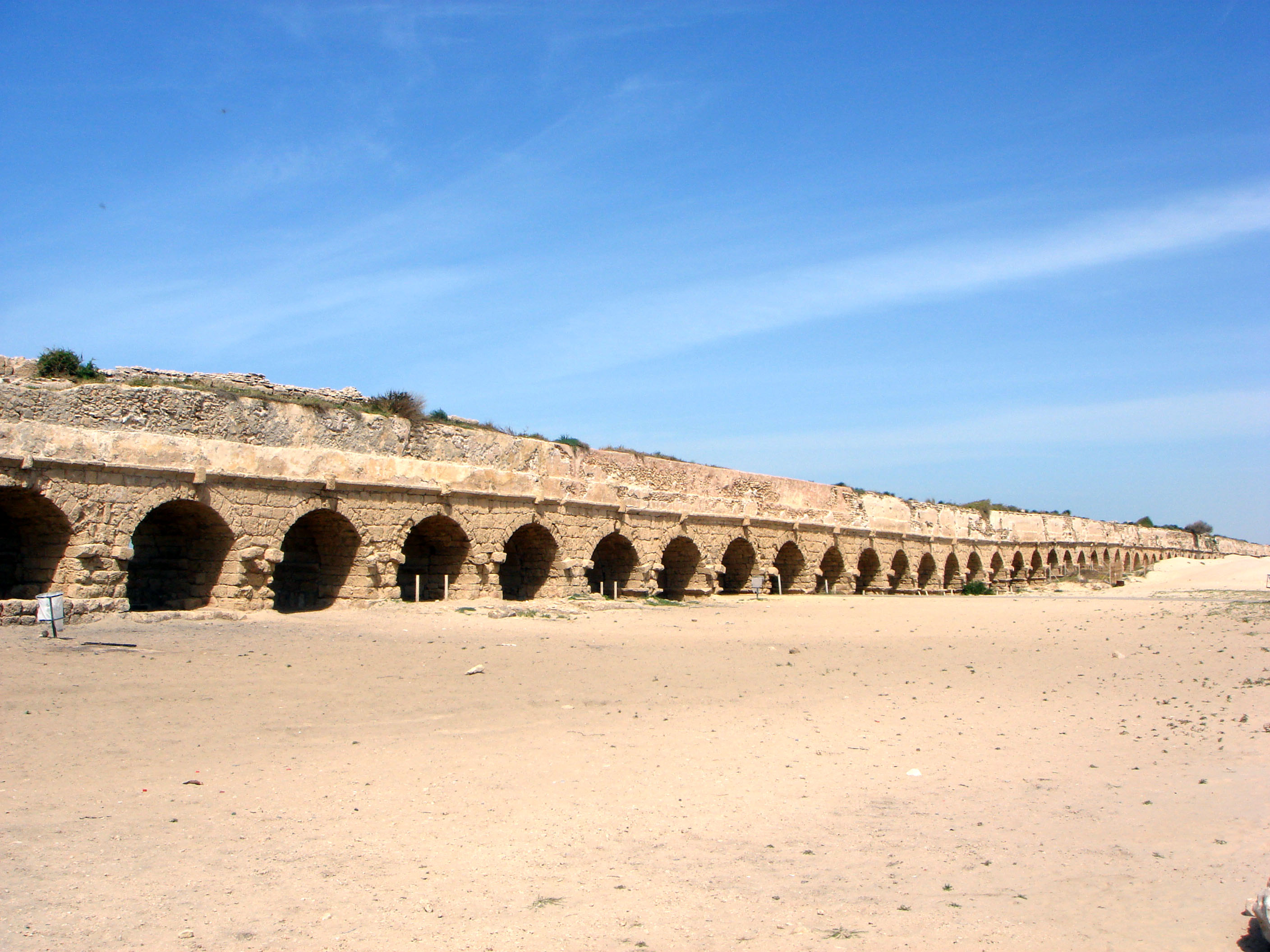
The Roman aqueduct

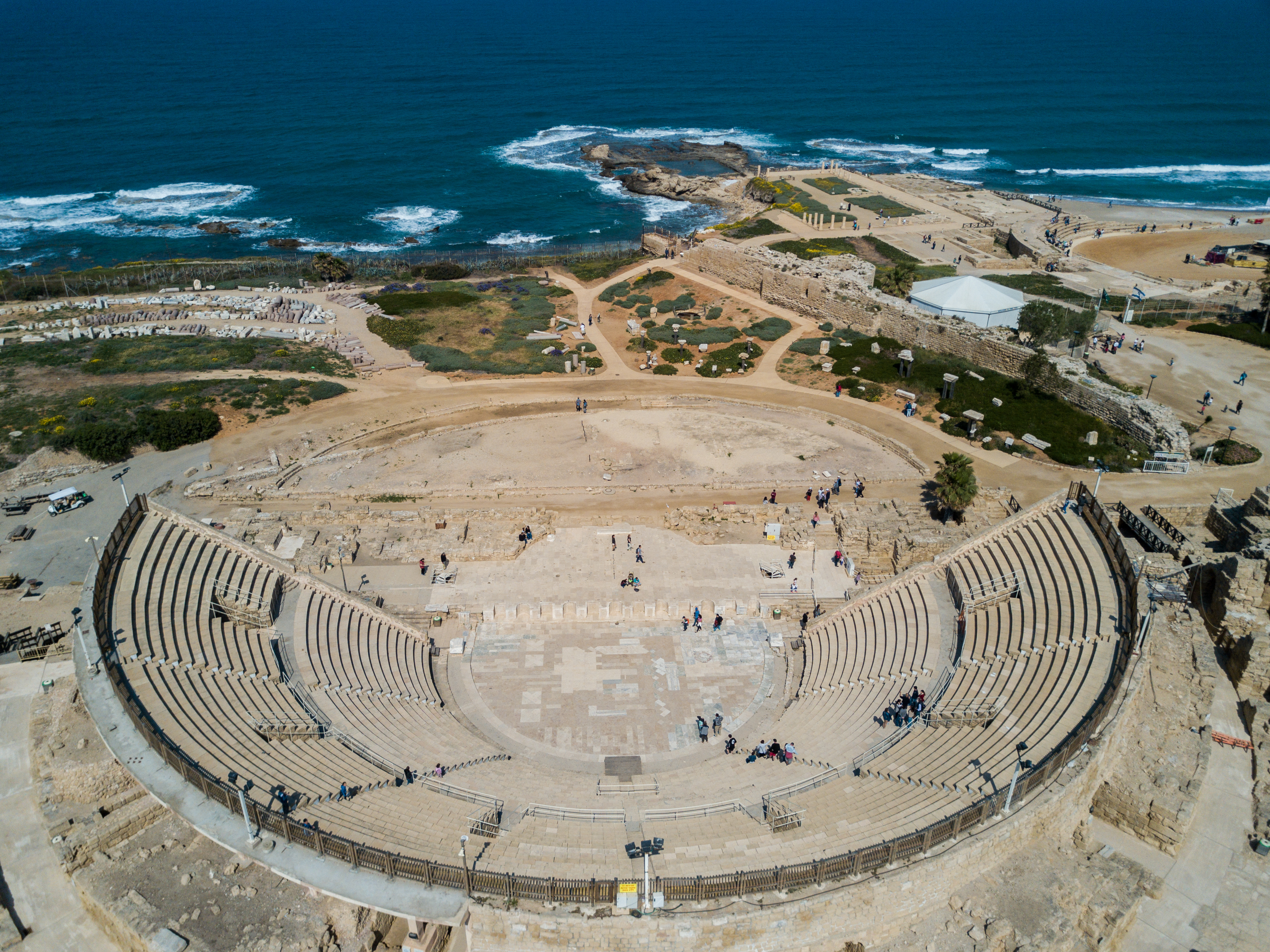
The theatre

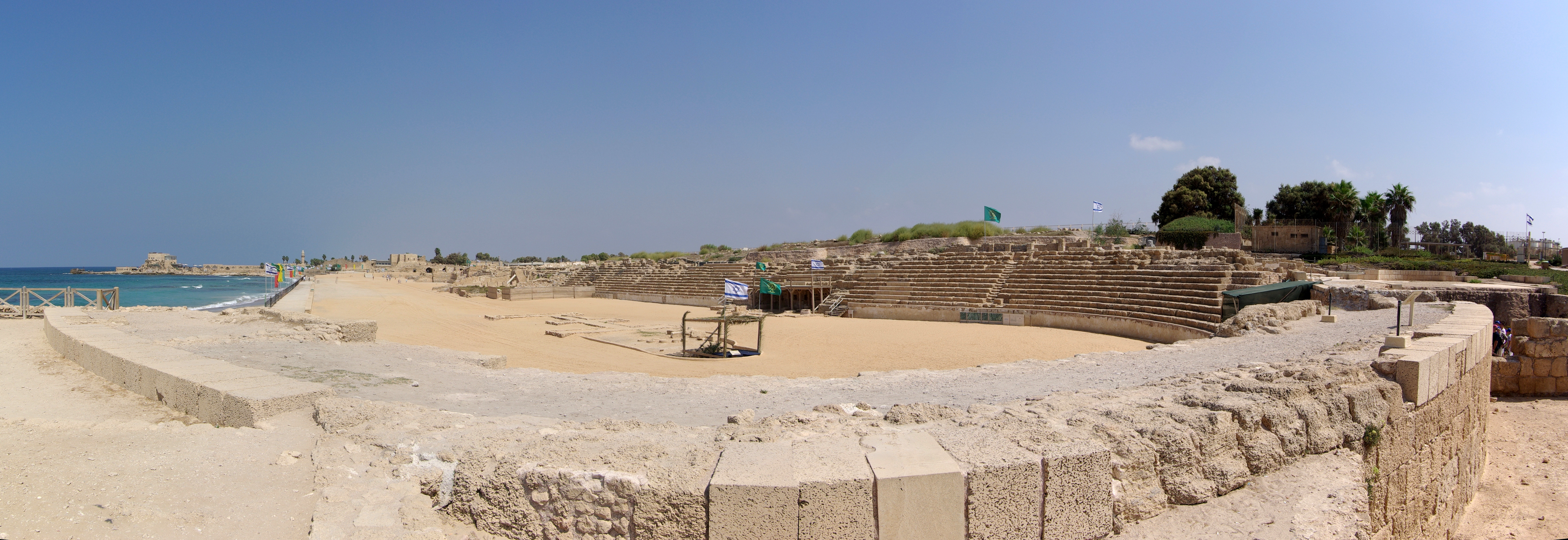
The Herodian hippodrome

Caesarea was built in Roman Judea under the Jewish client King Herod the Great during c. 22-10/9 BCE near the ruins of the small naval station of Straton's Tower. The site, along with all of Judea, was awarded by Rome to Herod in 30 BCE. The pagan city underwent vast changes under Herod, who renamed it Caesarea in honour of the Roman emperor, Caesar Augustus. Caesarea was known as the administrative, economic, and cultural capital of the Judean province from this time.

In 22 BCE, Herod began construction of a deep-sea harbour named Sebastos and built storerooms, markets, wide roads, baths, a temple to the goddess Roma and Emperor Augustus, and imposing public buildings. Herod built his palace on a promontory jutting out into the sea, with a decorative pool surrounded by stoas. Every five years, the city hosted major sports competitions, gladiator games, and theatrical productions in its theatre overlooking the Mediterranean Sea.

==== Sebastos harbor ====
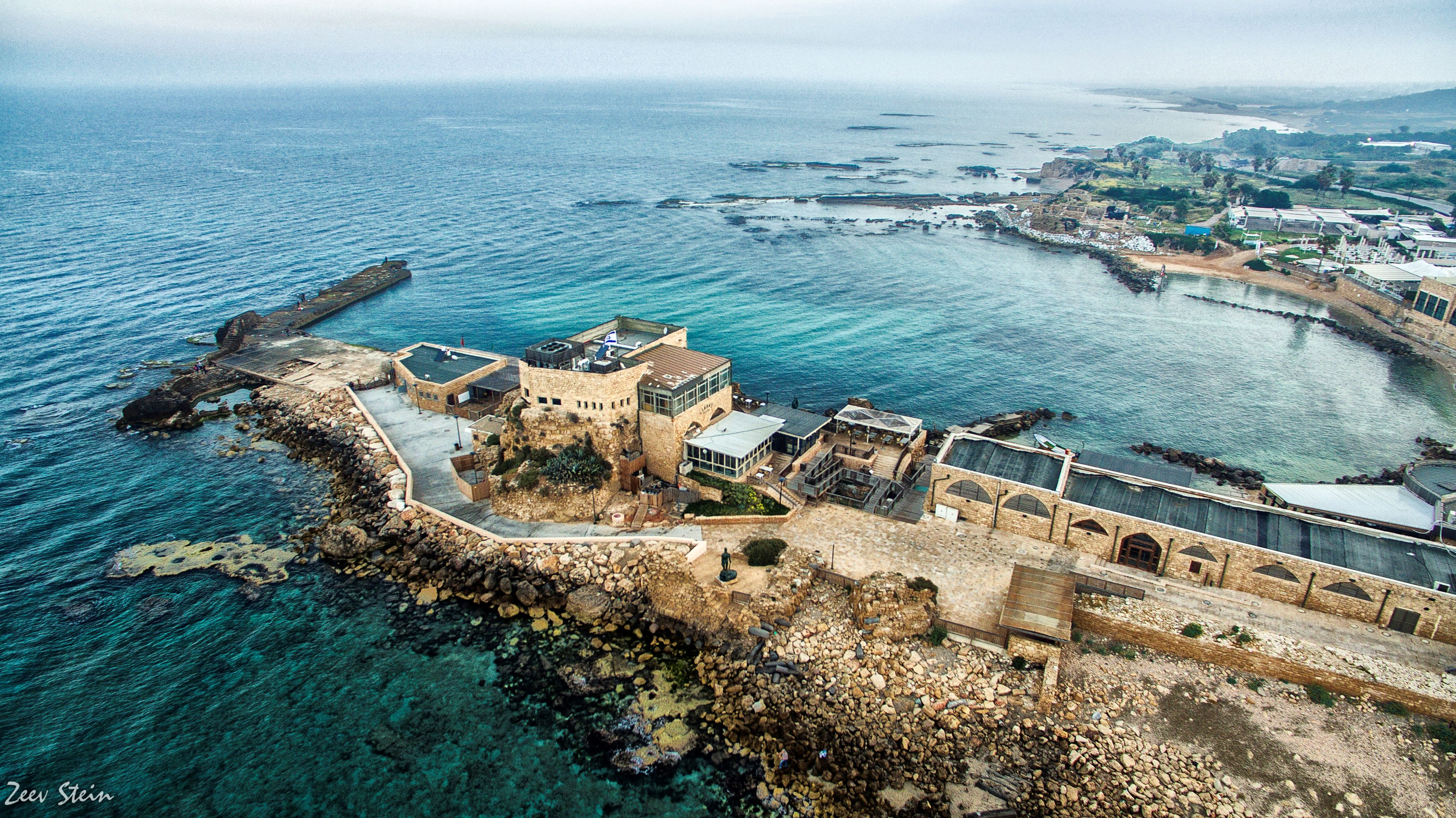
The harbor

Herod built the two jetties of the harbour between 22 and 15 BCE, and in 10/9 BCE he dedicated the city and harbour to Emperor Augustus (sebastos is Greek for augustus). The pace of construction was impressive considering the project's size and complexity. At its height, Sebastos was one of the most impressive harbours of its time. It had been constructed on a coast that had no natural harbours and served as an important commercial harbour in antiquity, rivaling Cleopatra's harbour at Alexandria. Josephus writes: "Although the location was generally unfavorable, [Herod] contended with the difficulties so well that the solidity of the construction could not be overcome by the sea, and its beauty seemed finished off without impediment."

When it was built in the 1st century BCE, the harbour of Sebastos ranked as the largest artificial harbour built in the open sea, enclosing around 100,000 m^{2}.

The breakwaters were made of lime and pozzolana, a type of volcanic ash, set into an underwater concrete. Herod imported over 24,000 m^{3} of pozzolana from the name-giving town of Puteoli, today Pozzuoli in Italy, to construct the two breakwaters: the southern one 500 meter, and the northern one 275 meter long.

A shipment of this size would have required at least 44 shiploads of 400 tons each. Herod also had 12,000 m^{3} of local kurkar stone quarried to make rubble and 12,000 m^{3} of slaked lime mixed with the pozzolana.

Architects had to devise a way to lay the wooden forms for the placement of concrete underwater. One technique was to drive stakes into the ground to make a box and then fill it with pozzolana concrete bit by bit. However, this method required many divers to hammer the planks to the stakes underwater and large quantities of pozzolana were necessary.

Another technique was a double planking method used in the northern breakwater. On land, carpenters would construct a box with beams and frames on the inside and a watertight, double-planked wall on the outside. This double wall was built with a 23 cm (9 in) gap between the inner and outer layer.

Although the box had no bottom, it was buoyant enough to float out to sea because of the watertight space between the inner and outer walls. Once it was floated into position, pozzolana was poured into the gap between the walls and the box would sink into place on the seafloor and be staked down in the corners. The flooded inside area was then filled by divers bit by bit with pozzolana-lime mortar and kurkar rubble until it rose above sea level.

On the southern breakwater, barge construction was used. The southern side of Sebastos was much more exposed than the northern side, requiring sturdier breakwaters. Instead of using the double planked method filled with rubble, the architects sank barges filled with layers of pozzolana concrete and lime sand mortar. The barges were similar to boxes without lids, and were constructed using mortise and tenon joints, the same technique used in ancient boats, to ensure they remained watertight. The barges were ballasted with 0.5 meters of pozzolana concrete and floated out to their position. With alternating layers, pozzolana-based and lime-based concretes were hand-placed inside the barge to sink it and fill it up to the surface.

However, there were underlying problems that led to its demise. Studies of the concrete cores of the moles have shown that the concrete was much weaker than similar pozzolana hydraulic concrete used in ancient Italian ports. For unknown reasons, the pozzolana mortar did not adhere as well to the kurkar rubble as it did to other rubble types used in Italian harbours. Small but numerous holes in some of the cores also indicate that the lime was of poor quality and stripped out of the mixture by strong waves before it could set.

Also, large lumps of lime were found in all five of the cores studied at Caesarea, which shows that the mixture was not mixed thoroughly. However, stability would not have been seriously affected if the harbour had not been constructed over a geological fault line that runs along the coast. Seismic action gradually took its toll on the breakwaters, causing them to tilt down and settle into the seabed. Studies of seabed deposits at Caesarea have shown that a tsunami struck the area sometime during the 1st or 2nd century.

Although it is unknown if this tsunami simply damaged or completely destroyed the harbour, it is known that by the 6th century the harbour was unusable and today the jetties lie more than 5 meters underwater.

=== Capital of Roman province ===
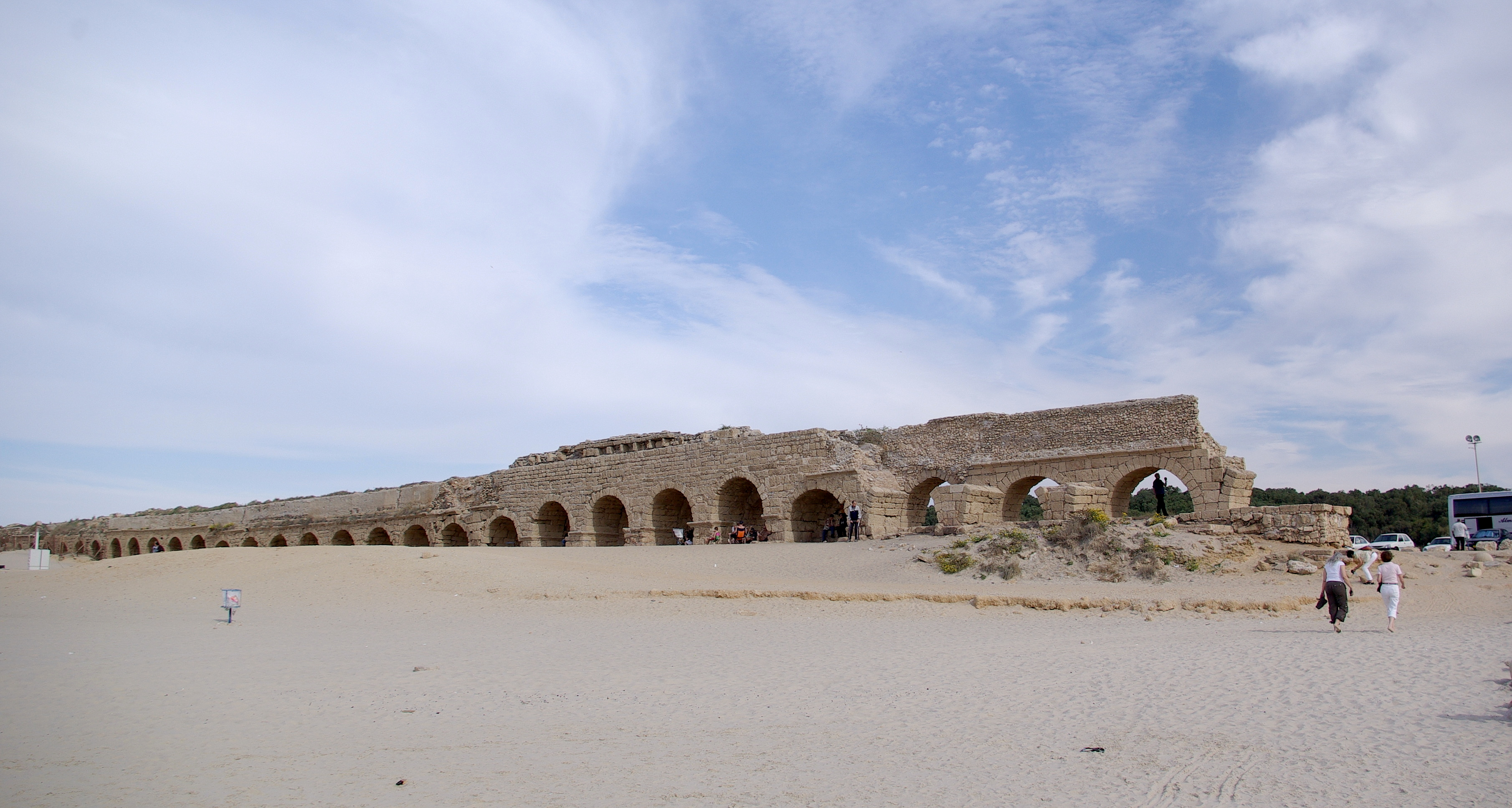
The Roman double aqueduct that brought water from the foot of the Carmel range to Caesarea

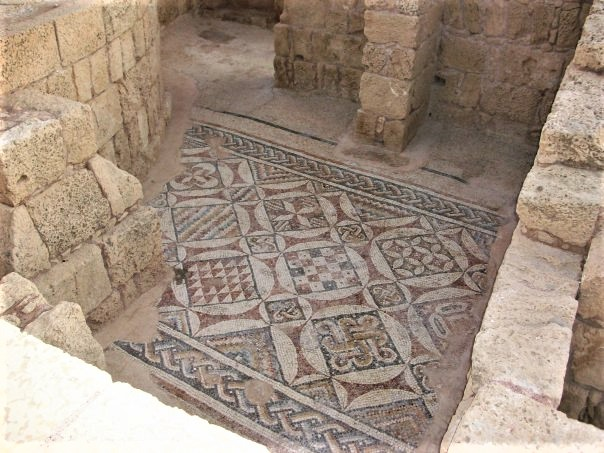
Mosaics

When Judea became a Roman province in 6 CE, Caesarea replaced Jerusalem as its civilian and military capital and became the official residence of its governors, such as procurator Antonius Felix and prefect Pontius Pilatus. The city was chiefly a commercial centre relying on trade.

Caeserea is described in detail by the 1st-century Roman Jewish historian Flavius Josephus. Josephus describes the harbour as being as large as the one at Piraeus, the major harbour of Athens. Remains of the principal buildings erected by Herod the Great as well as the medieval town are still visible today, including the Crusader city, the city walls, the ruined citadel surrounded by the sea, and remains of the cathedral and a second church. Herod's Caesarea grew rapidly, in time becoming the largest city in Judaea with an estimated population of 125,000 over an urban area of 3.7 square kilometres (1.4 sq mi). According to Josephus, Caesarea was the scene in 26 CE of a major act of civil disobedience to protest against Pilate's order to plant eagle standards on the Temple Mount of Jerusalem.

Emperor Vespasian raised its status to that of a Colonia, with the name Colonia Prima Flavia Augusta Caesarea. According to Josephus, the outbreak of the Jewish revolt of 66 CE was provoked by Greeks of a certain merchant house in Caesarea sacrificing birds in front of a local synagogue. In 70 CE, after the Jewish revolt was suppressed, games were held there to celebrate the victory of Titus. Many Jewish captives were brought to Caesarea; Kasher claims that 2,500 captives were "slaughtered in gladiatorial games".

A Samaritan tradition preserved in the Tolidah called Caesarea Deron and attributed its original foundation to Seth. It further related that Vespasian rebuilt the city and constructed waterworks that dammed streams and brought water into it.

In the aftermath of the Bar Kokhba revolt Caesarea was changed to Syria Palaestina in 135. Caesarea was one of four Roman colonies for veteran Roman soldiers in the Syria-Phoenicia region. Caesarea is mentioned in the 3rd-century Mosaic of Rehob, with respect to its non-Jewish population.

==== Centre of Early and Byzantine Christianity; bishopric ====
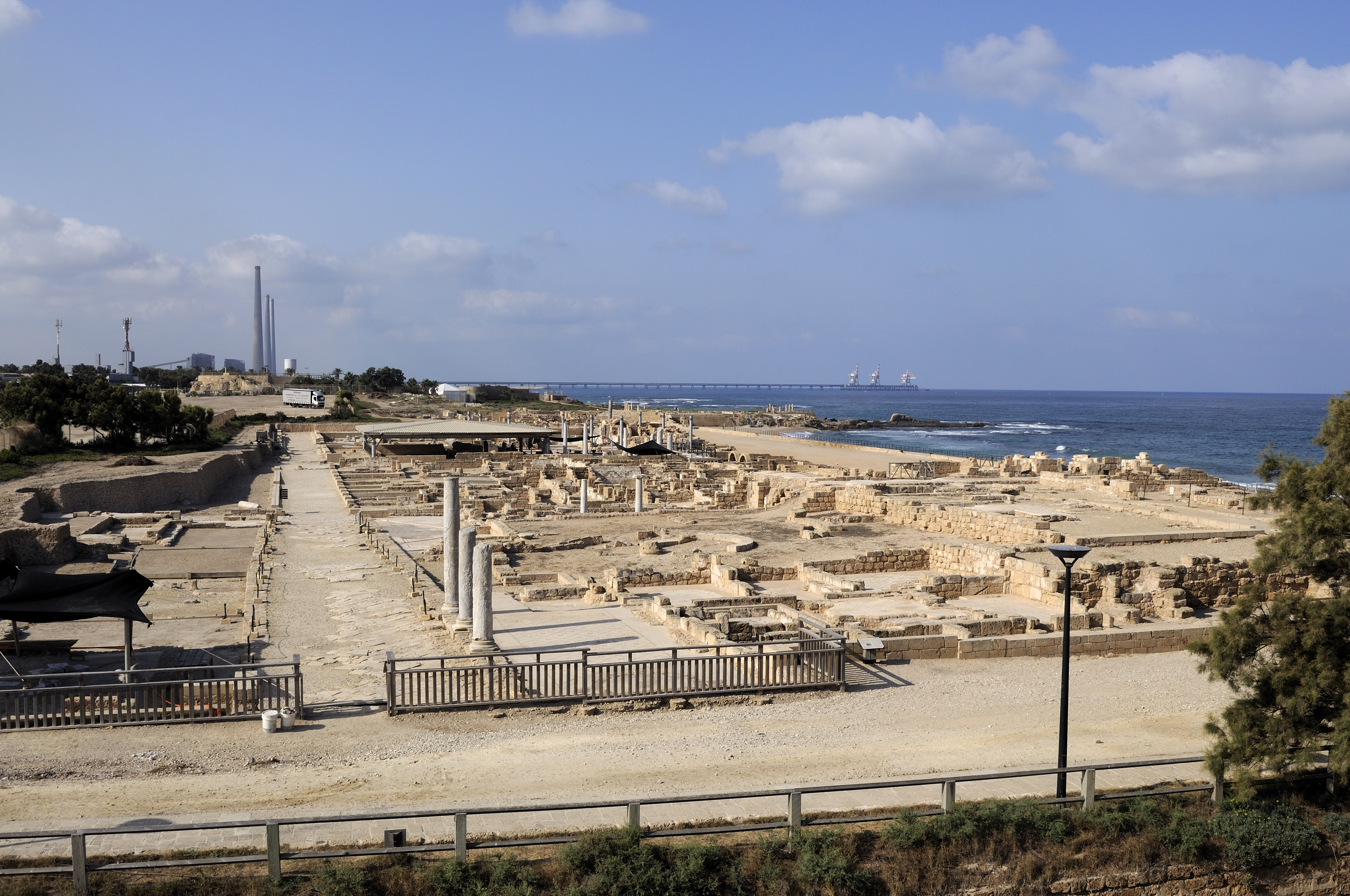
The ancient city looking south

According to the Acts of the Apostles, Caesarea was first introduced to Christianity by Philip the Deacon, who later had a house there in which he gave hospitality to Paul the Apostle. It was there that Peter the Apostle baptized Cornelius the Centurion and his household, the first time Christian baptism was conferred on Gentiles. When newly converted Paul was in danger in Jerusalem, the Christians there accompanied him to Caesarea and sent him off to his native Tarsus. He visited Caesarea between his second and third missionary journeys. Paul was a prisoner in Caesarea for two years before being sent to Rome.

In the 3rd century, Origen wrote his Hexapla and other exegetical and theological works while living in Caesarea. The Nicene Creed may have originated in Caesarea. The Apostolic Constitutions says that the first Bishop of Caesarea was Zacchaeus the Publican, followed by Cornelius (possibly Cornelius the Centurion) and Theophilus (possibly the recipient of the Gospel of Luke). The first bishops considered historically attested are those mentioned by the early church historian Eusebius of Caesarea, who was the bishop of the see in the 4th century. He speaks of Theophilus who was bishop in the 10th year of Commodus (c. 189), of Theoctistus (216–258), Domnus, and Theotecnus, and Agapius. Among the participants in the Synod of Ancyra in 314 was the bishop of Caesarea named Agricolaus, who may have been the immediate predecessor of Eusebius, who does not mention him, or who may have been bishop of a different Caesarea. The immediate successors of Eusebius were Acacius (340–366) and Gelasius (367–372, 380–395). The latter was ousted by the semi-Arian Euzoius between 373 and 379. French historian Michel Le Quien gives much information about all of these and about later bishops of Caesarea. The Greek Orthodox Church of Jerusalem has a metropolitan see in Caesarea. The Latin archbishopric of Caesarea in Palestina was made a Roman Catholic titular see in 1432. The Melkite Catholic Church considers Caesarea a titular see.

Through Origen and especially the scholarly presbyter Pamphilus of Caesarea, the theological school of Caesarea gained a reputation for having the most extensive ecclesiastical library of the time, containing more than 30,000 manuscripts: Gregory Nazianzus, Basil the Great, Jerome and others came to study there. The Caesarean text-type is recognized by scholars as one of the earliest New Testament types. The collections of the library suffered during the persecutions under Emperor Diocletian but were repaired subsequently by bishops of Caesarea. The library is mentioned as late as 6th-century manuscripts, but it may not have survived the capture of Caesarea by the Muslim armies in 640.

=== Byzantine period ===
During the Byzantine period, Caesarea became the capital of the province of Palaestina Prima in 390. Caesarea was also the metropolitan see, with ecclesiastical jurisdiction over Jerusalem, when rebuilt after its destruction in 70. In 451, however, the Council of Chalcedon established Jerusalem as a patriarchate, with Caesarea as the first of its three subordinate metropolitan sees. Caesarea remained the provincial capital throughout the 5th and 6th centuries. It fell to Sassanid Persia in the Byzantine–Sasanian War of 602–628, in 614, and was re-conquered by Byzantium in 625.

=== Early Muslim period ===
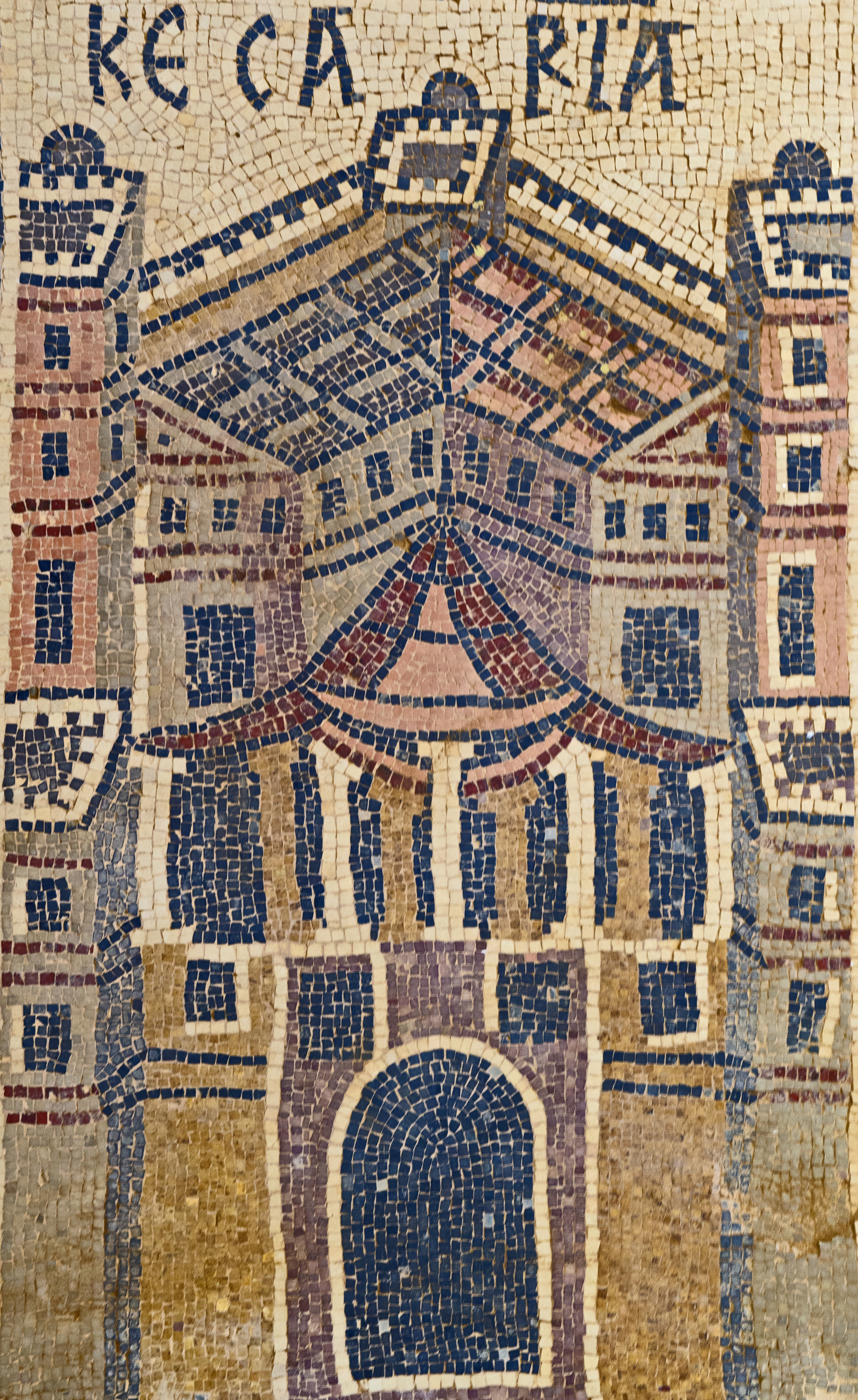
Depiction of Caesarea in the Umm ar-Rasas mosaics, circa 8th century

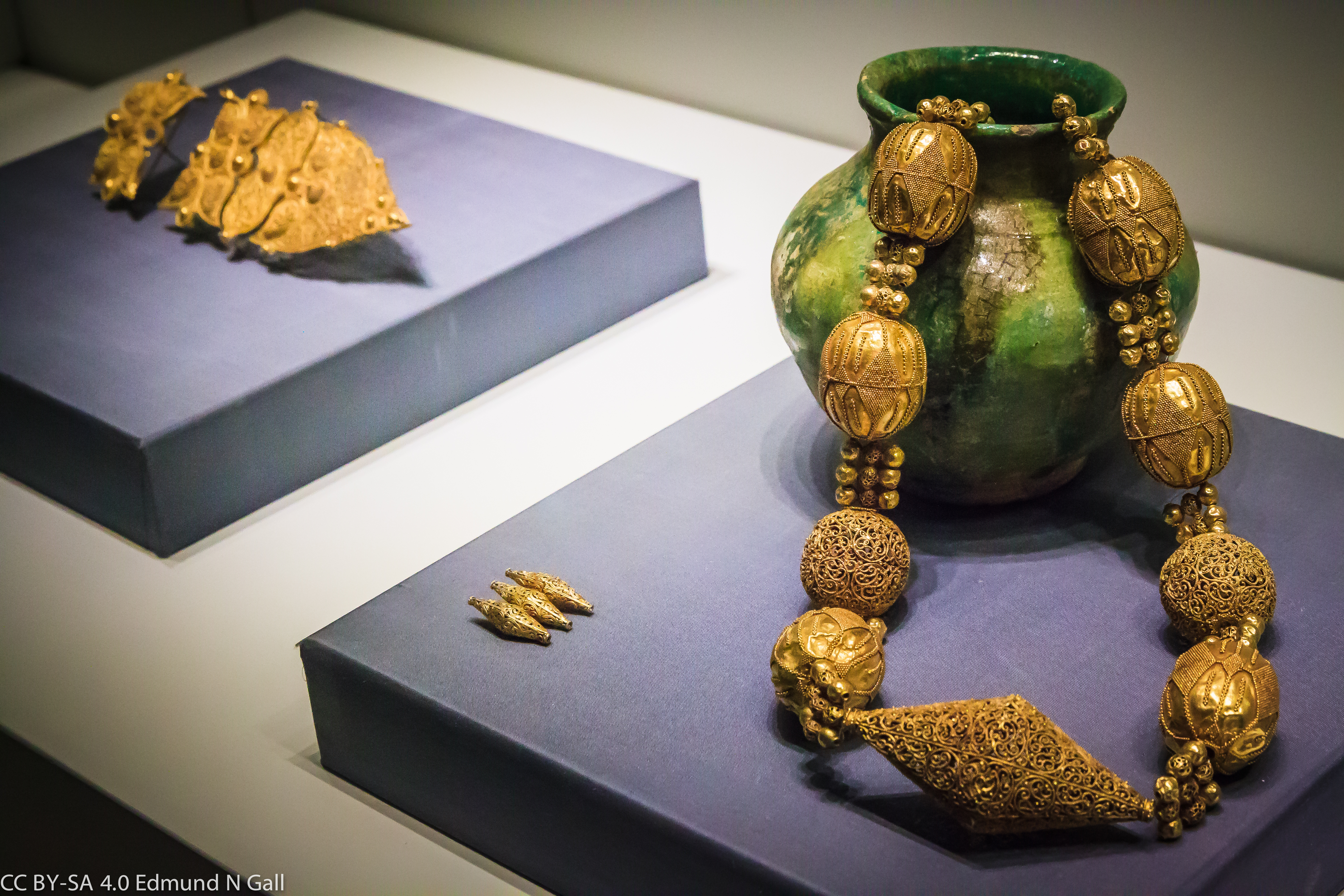
11th century (Fatimid period) jewelry from Caesarea

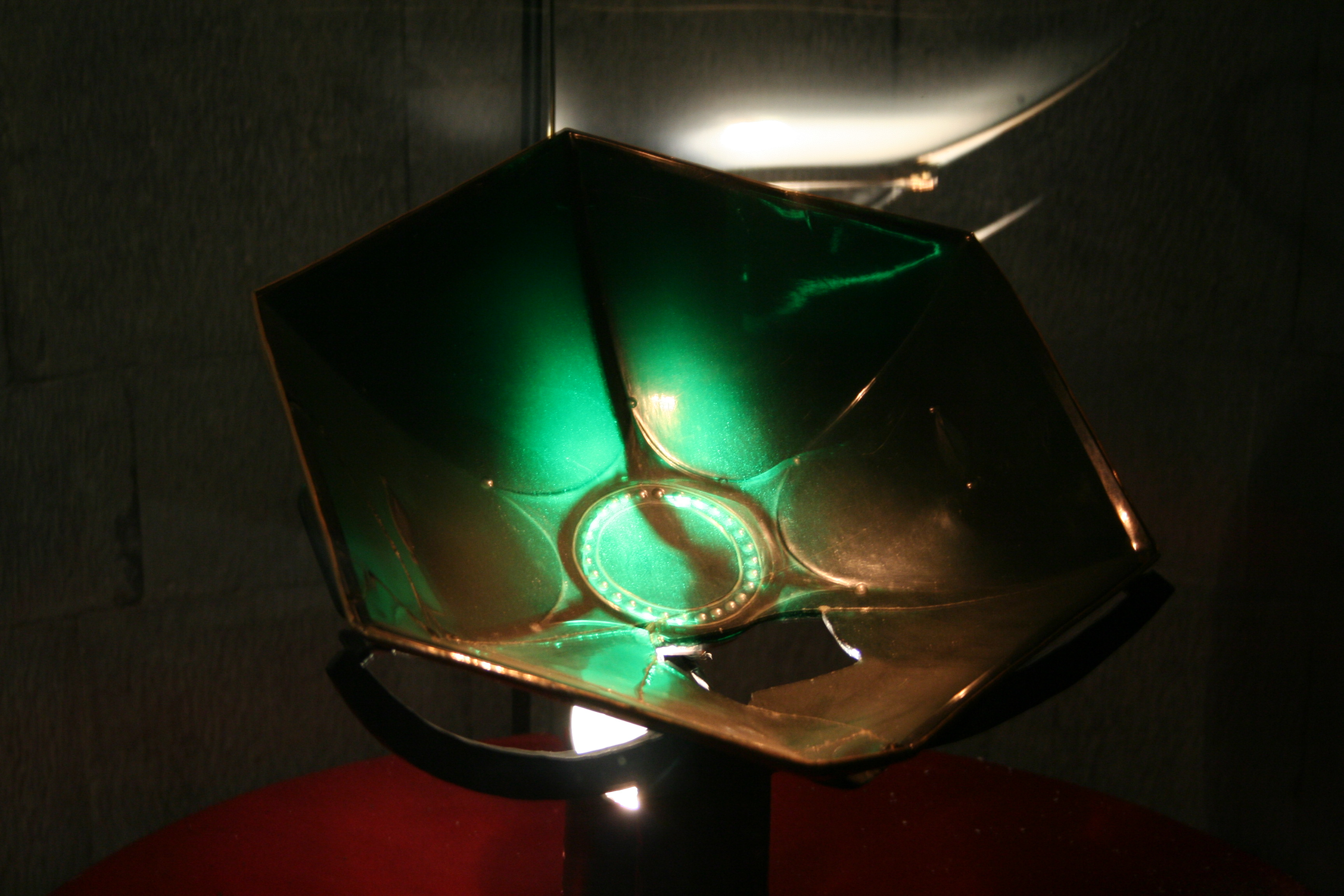
The Sacro Catino, a hexagonal bowl made from green Egyptian glass, c. 9 cm high and 33 cm across, possibly brought from Caesarea to Genoa by Guglielmo Embriaco in 1101. Described as an object with miraculous properties in 12th-century literature, including the Historia of William of Tyre, it was only identified as the Holy Grail in the 13th century by Jacobus de Voragine. Seized and taken to Paris by Napoleon in 1805, it was damaged when it was returned to Genoa in 1816, which served to prove that it was made of glass, not emerald.

Caesarea was lost for good by the Byzantines to the Muslim conquest in 640. Archaeological excavations discovered a destruction layer connected to the Muslim conquest of the city. Some newer research posits that there was no destruction caused by the Persians in 614 and Muslim Arabs in 640, but rather a gradual economic decline accompanied by the Christian aristocracy fleeing from the city.

According to 9th-century Muslim historian al-Baladhuri, the fall of the city was the result of the betrayal of a certain Yusef, who conducted a party of troops of Muawiyah into the city. The city appears to have been partially destroyed upon its conquest. The 7th-century Coptic bishop John of Nikiû, claims there were "horrors committed in the city of Caesarea in Palestine", while al-Baladhuri merely states that Kaisariyyah/Cæsarea was "reduced", mentioning it as one of ten towns in Jund Filastin (military district of Palestine) conquered by the Muslim Rashidun army under 'Amr ibn al-'As's leadership during the 630s. After the fall of Caesarea, 4,000 "heads" (captives), men, women and children, were sent to Caliph Umar in Medina, where they were gathered and inspected on the Jurd Plain, a plain commonly used to assemble the troops of Medina before battle, with room for thousands of people, before they were distributed as war booty to slavery in the Rashidun Caliphate.

The former Palaestina Prima became Jund Filastin, with the capital first at Ludd and then at Ramla. The city likely remained inhabited for some time under Arab rule, during the 7th and 8th centuries, albeit with much reduced population. Archaeological evidence shows a clear destruction layer identified with the conquest of 640, followed by some evidence of renewed settlement in the early Umayyad Caliphate. The area was farmed from the Rashidun Caliphate through to the First Crusade.

By the 11th century, it appears that the town had once again been developed into a fortified city. Writing in 1047, Nasir Khusraw describes it as "a fine city, with running waters, and palm-gardens, and orange and citron trees. Its walls are strong, and it has an iron gate. There are fountains that gush out within the city". This is in agreement with William of Tyre's description of the Crusaders' siege in 1101, mentioning catapults and siege engines used against the city fortifications. Nasir Khusraw notes a "beautiful Friday mosque" in Caesarea, "so situated that in its court you may sit and enjoy the view of all that is passing on the sea." This was converted into the church of St. Peter in Crusader times. A wall which may belong to this building has been identified in modern times.

In the early Islamic period, Caesarea reportedly had a significant Jewish and Samaritan population, with al-Baladhuri mentioning 20,000 Jews and 30,000 Samaritans at the time of its capture in 640. While these figures are debated by historians, it is known that a sizable Jewish community existed in the city during the 7th century.

=== Crusader/Ayyubid and Mamluk periods ===
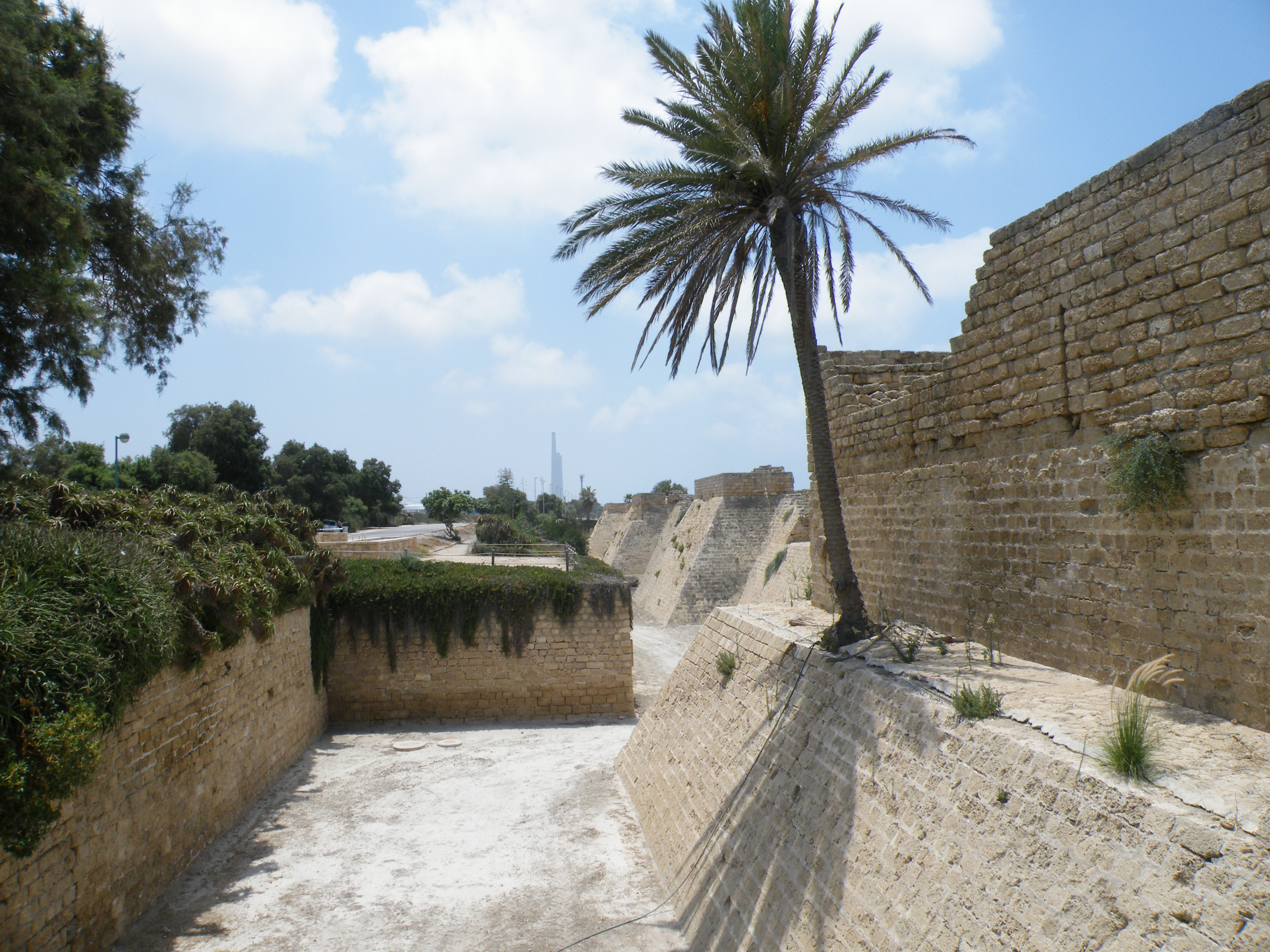
Remnants of the walls and moat built by Louis IX of France in 1251

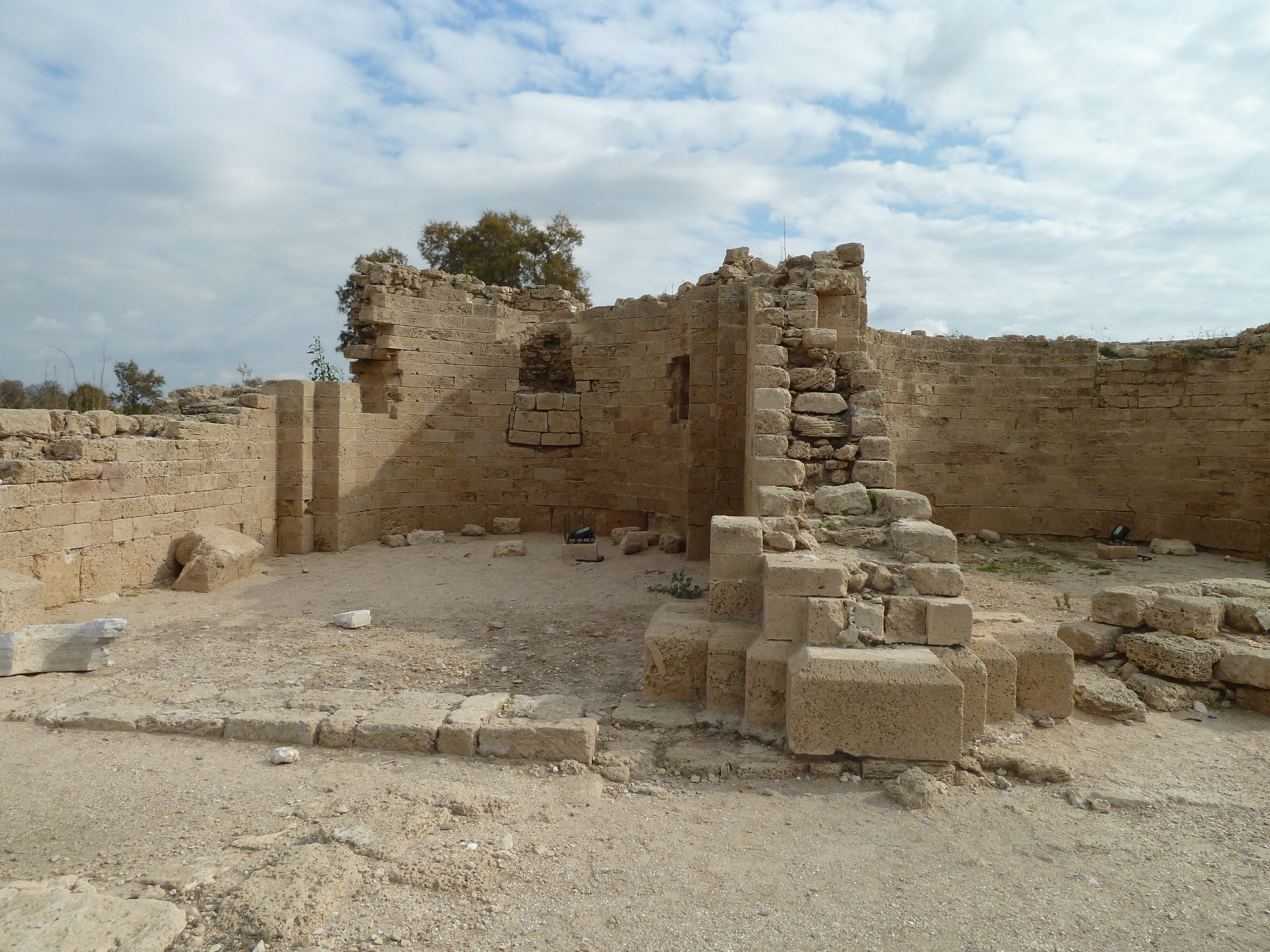
The ruins of a side apse and the main apse of St. Peter's Cathedral in Caesarea

Caesarea was taken by Baldwin I in the wake of the First Crusade, in 1101. Baldwin sent a message to emir of Caesarea, demanding him to surrender the city or face a siege, but the Muslims refused. On May 2, 1101, Baldwin began sieging the city with trebuchets. After 15 days of resistance, the Crusader army broke through the defenses. Like in Jerusalem in 1099, the Crusaders proceeded to slaughter a portion of the male populace, enslave the women and children, and loot the city. William of Tyre describes the use of catapults and siege towers, and states that the city was taken in an assault after 15 days of siege and given over to looting and pillaging. Syriac Orthodox patriarch Michael the Syrian (born ca. 1126) records that the city was "devastated upon its capture".

Baldwin spared the emir and qadi for a hefty ransom. Baldwin appointed a cleric veteran of the First Crusade, also named Baldwin, as the Latin archbishop of Caesarea. The city was under Crusader control between 1101 and 1187 and again between 1191 and 1265. William of Tyre mentions the discovery of a "vessel of the most green colour, in the shape of a serving dish" (vas coloris viridissimi, in modum parapsidis formatum) which the Genuese thought to be made of emerald, and accepted as their share of the spoils. This refers to the hexagonal bowl known as the Sacro Catino in Italian, which was brought to Genoa by Guglielmo Embriaco and was later identified as the Holy Chalice. Caesarea was incorporated as a lordship (dominion) within the Kingdom of Jerusalem, and the Latin See of Caesarea was established, with ten archbishops listed for the period 1101–1266 (treated as titular see from 1432–1967). Archbishop Heraclius attended the Third Lateran Council in 1179.

Saladin recaptured the city in 1187, but it was once again captured by the Crusaders during the Third Crusade in 1191. In 1251 during the Seventh Crusade, Louis IX of France fortified the city, ordering the construction of high walls (parts of which are still standing) and a deep moat.

By the 12th century, Spanish-Jewish explorer Benjamin of Tudela recorded only 200 Jews and 200 Samaritans in Caesarea, a sharp decline from the much larger populations reported in the 7th century. This reduction aligns with the fact that the city's enclosed area had shrunk by more than 85 percent between the Byzantine and Fatimid periods.

In 1265 the city was reconquered by the Mamluk armies of Sultan Baibars, who ordered his troops to scale the walls in several places simultaneously, enabling them to penetrate the city. Baibars destroyed the fortified city completely to prevent its re-emergence as a Crusader stronghold, in line with the Mamluk practice in other former Crusader coastal cities. During the Mamluk period, the ruins of ancient Caesarea and of the Crusader fortified town lay uninhabited. Al-Dimashqi, writing around 1300, notes that Kaisariyyah belonged to the Kingdom of Ghazza (Gaza).

=== Ottoman period ===
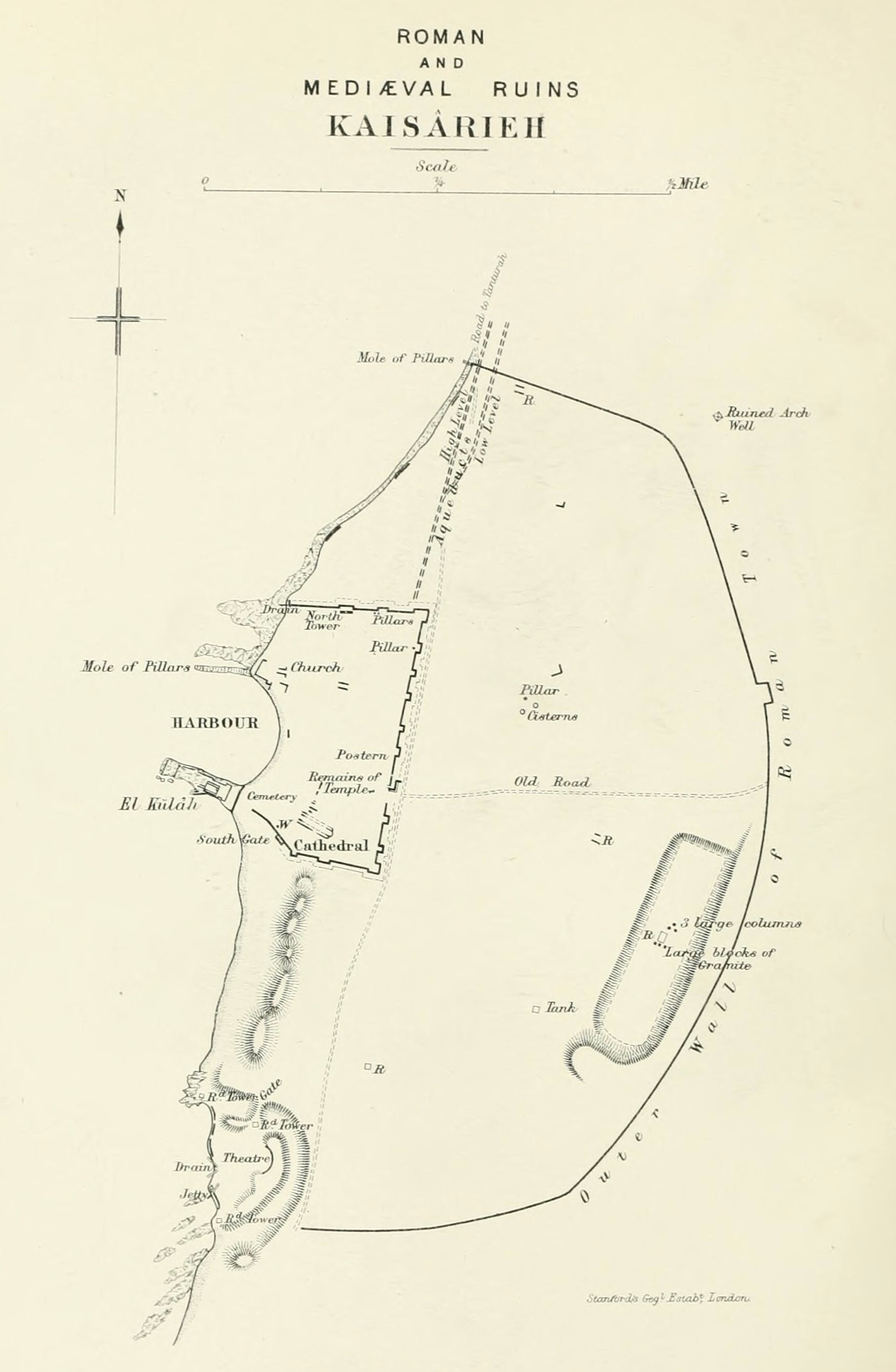
Roman and medieval ruins in "Kaisarieh", drawn for the 1871–77 PEF Survey of Palestine

Caesarea became part of the Ottoman Empire in 1516, along with the rest of the Levant, and remained under Ottoman rule for four centuries. In 1664, a settlement is mentioned consisting of 100 Moroccan families and 7 to 8 Jewish ones. In the 18th century it again declined. In 1806, the German explorer Ulrich Jasper Seetzen saw "Káisserérie" as a ruin occupied by some poor fishermen and their families. In 1870, French explorer Victor Guérin visited the site.

==== Bosniak village ====
The village of Qisarya (Arabic: قيسارية) was allocated in 1880 to Bushnak (Bosniak) immigrants from Bosnia. The Bosniaks had emigrated to the area after Ottoman Bosnia was occupied by Austria-Hungary in 1878. According to historian Roy Marom

Fifty families of Bosnian refugees, mostly from Mostar, the main urban center of Bosnia and Herzegovina, settled among the ruins of Caesarea, renaming it with the Arabic name of Qisarya. Using the ancient masonry found on site, the settlers constructed a modern town with spacious accommodations and broad intersecting streets, according to traditional Bosnian town-plans. The town had two mosques, a caravanserai, a marketplace, a residence for the mudir, a harbor and custom offices. Qisarya attracted high-ranking Bosnian functionaries who established estates near Qisarya. The town was declared the seat of a mudirieh (a minor administrative division).

A population list from about 1887 showed that Caesarea had 670 inhabitants, in addition to 265 Muslim inhabitants, who were noted as "Bosniaks".

Petersen, visiting the place in 1992, noted that the 19th-century houses were built in blocks, generally one story high, with the exception of the house of the governor. Some houses on the western side of the village, near the sea, had survived. There were several mosques in the village in the 19th century, but only one ("The Bosnian mosque") has survived. This mosque, located at the southern end of the city, next to the harbour, is described as a simple stone building with a red-tiled roof and a cylindrical minaret.

==== Bayyarat al-Khuri estate ====
In the early 20th century, the Greek Orthodox Patriarchate of Jerusalem established Bayyarat al-Khuri ('The Priest's Orchard') as an ecclesiastical agricultural estate within the confines of the Roman hippodrome, southeast of the late Ottoman Bosnian town. The complex—sometimes misidentified on British maps as a “Greek convent”—comprised a monumental limestone gateway bearing the taphos monogram of the Brotherhood of the Holy Sepulchre, a manually filled sabil (drinking fountain), a well house powered by a locally manufactured diesel engine, and a large plastered stepped water pool that fed open irrigation channels for citrus, date, and olive plots. In Addition, the Patriarchate owned extensive properties within the Bosnian town, including St. Paul's supposed Prison Cellar, and the remnants of Caesarea's Crusader cathedral. The Church properties inside the Bosnian town served as an occasional retreat for Church elders.

=== British Mandate ===
Qisarya قيسارية Qisarya
- Village
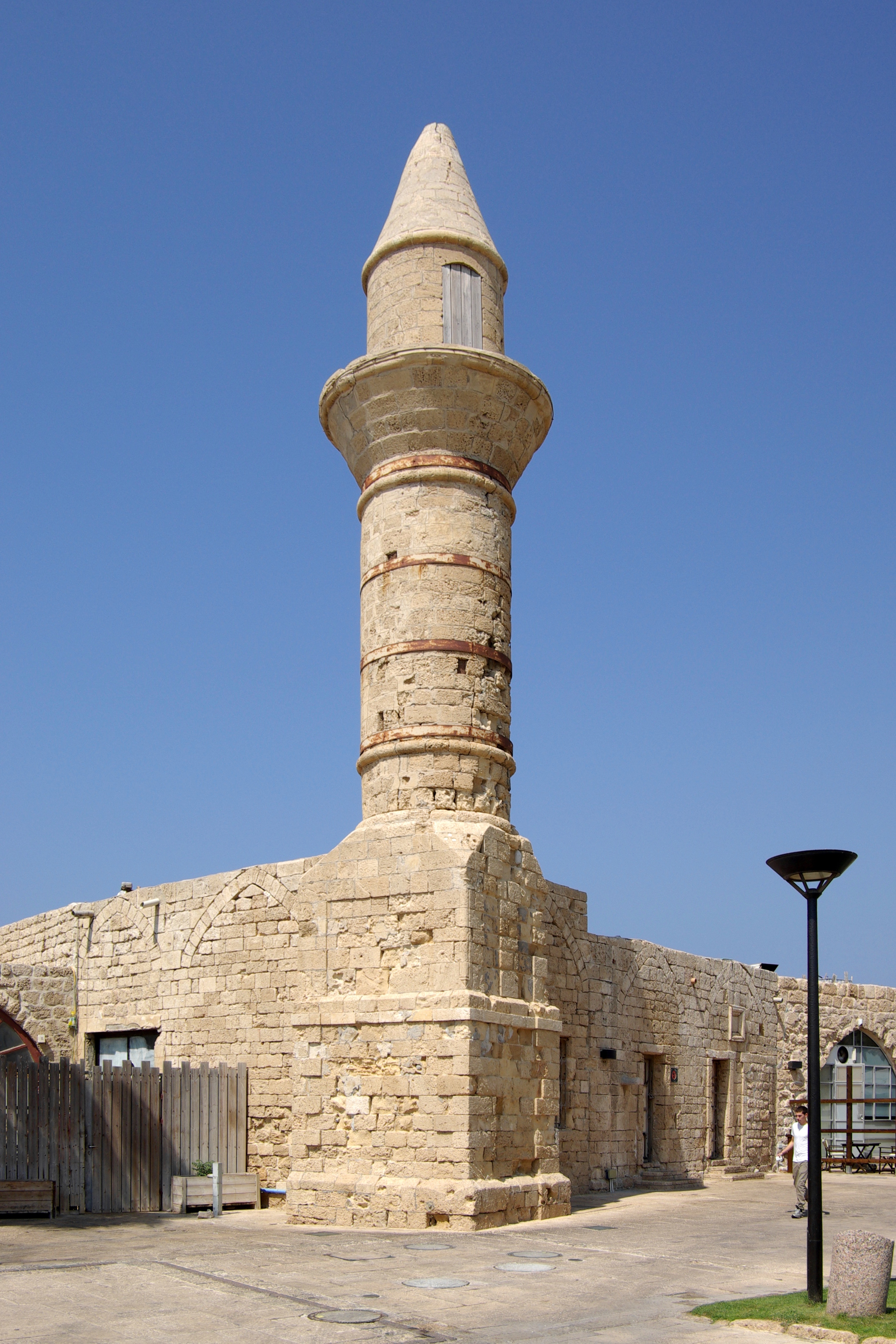
- The Bosnian Mosque at Qisarya
- Interactive map of Qisarya
- Palestine grid: 140/212
- Geopolitical entity: Mandatory Palestine
- Subdistrict: Haifa
- Date of depopulation: February 1948

Area
  - Total: 31,786 dunams (31.786 km^{2}; 12.273 sq mi)

Population (1945)
  - Total: 960
- Cause(s) of depopulation: Expulsion by Yishuv forces
- Current Localities: Caesarea

In the 1922 census of Palestine, conducted by the British Mandate authorities, Caesarea had a population of 346; 288 Muslims, 32 Christians and 26 Jews, where the Christians were 6 Orthodox, 3 Syrian Orthodox, 3 Roman Catholics, 4 Melkites, 2 Syrian Catholics and 14 Maronite. The population had increased in the 1931 census to 706; 19 Christians, 4 Druse and 683 Muslims, in 143 houses.

During the Arab Revolt in 1938 the resident priest, Father Hanna al-Khuri, was abducted and killed.

A Jewish settlement, Kibbutz Sdot Yam, was established 1 kilometre (0.62 mi) south of the Muslim town in 1940. The Muslim village declined in economic importance and many of Qisarya's Muslim inhabitants left in the mid-1940s, when the British extended the Palestine Railways which bypassed the shallow-draft port. Qisarya had a population of 960 in 1945 statistics, with Qisarya's population composition 930 Muslims and 30 Christians in 1945. In 1944/45 a total of 18 dunums of Muslim village land was used for citrus and bananas, 1,020 dunums were used for cereals, while 108 dunums were irrigated or used for orchards, while 111 dunams were built-up (urban) land. Kibbutz Sdot Yam reused Bayyarat al-Khuri for agriculture in the 1940s.

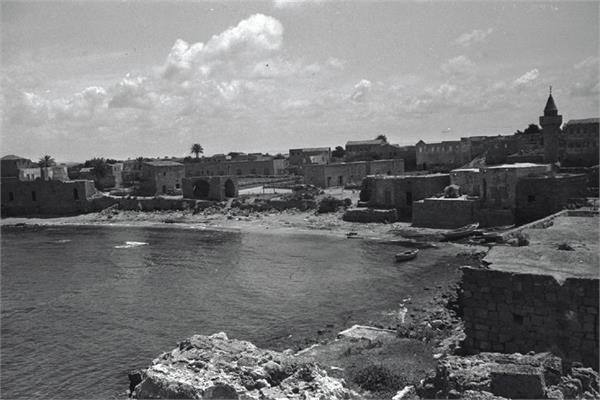
Caesarea 1947

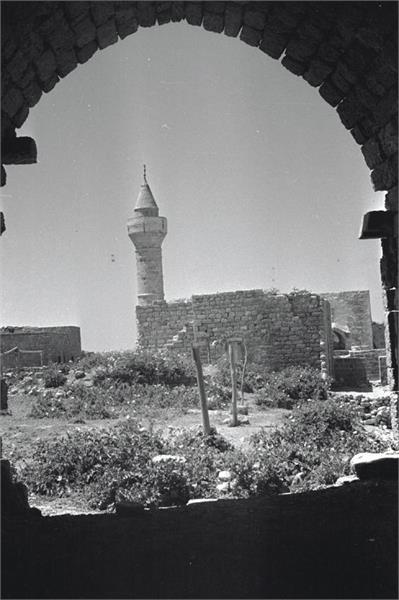
Caesarea 1947

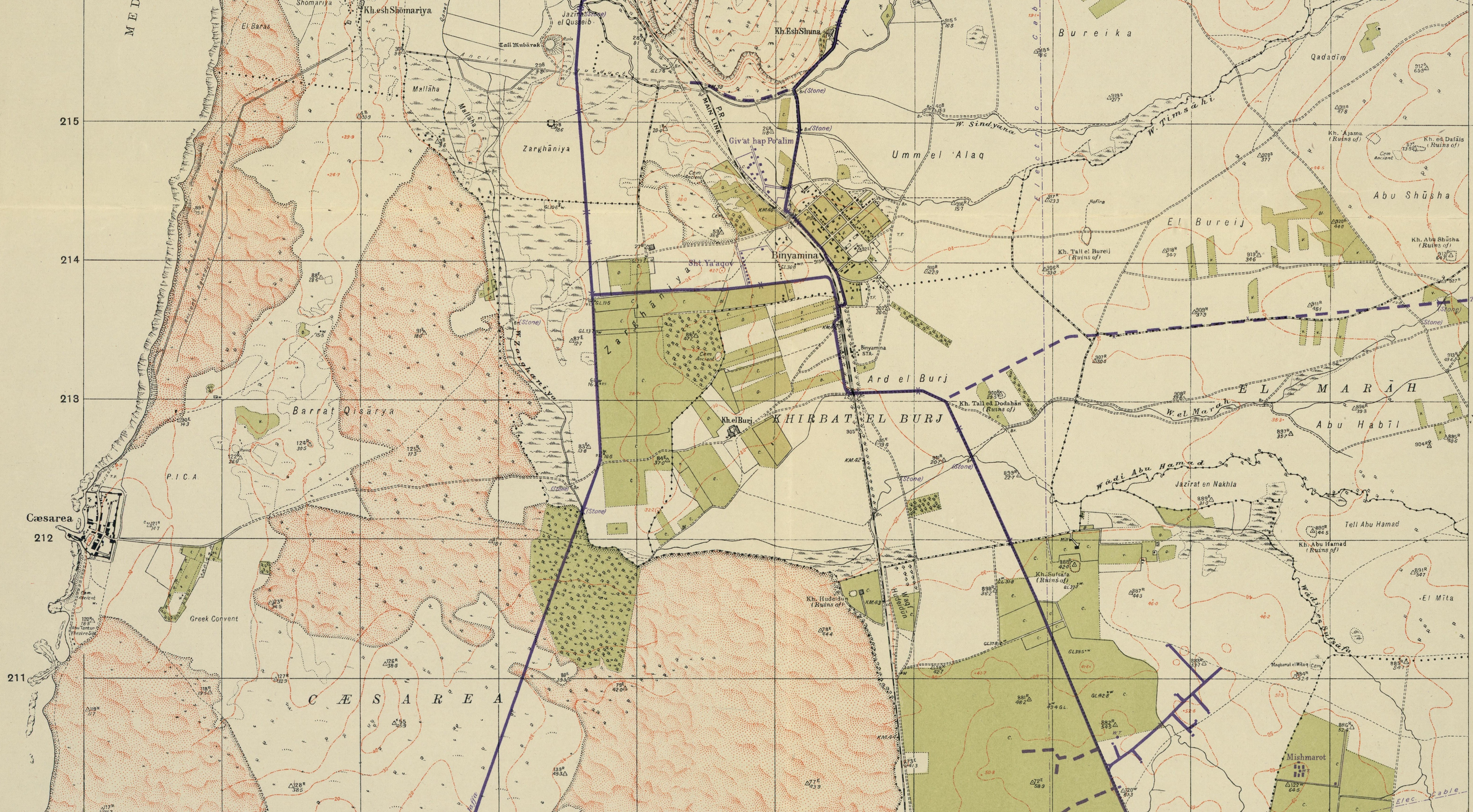
Caesarea 1942 1:20,000

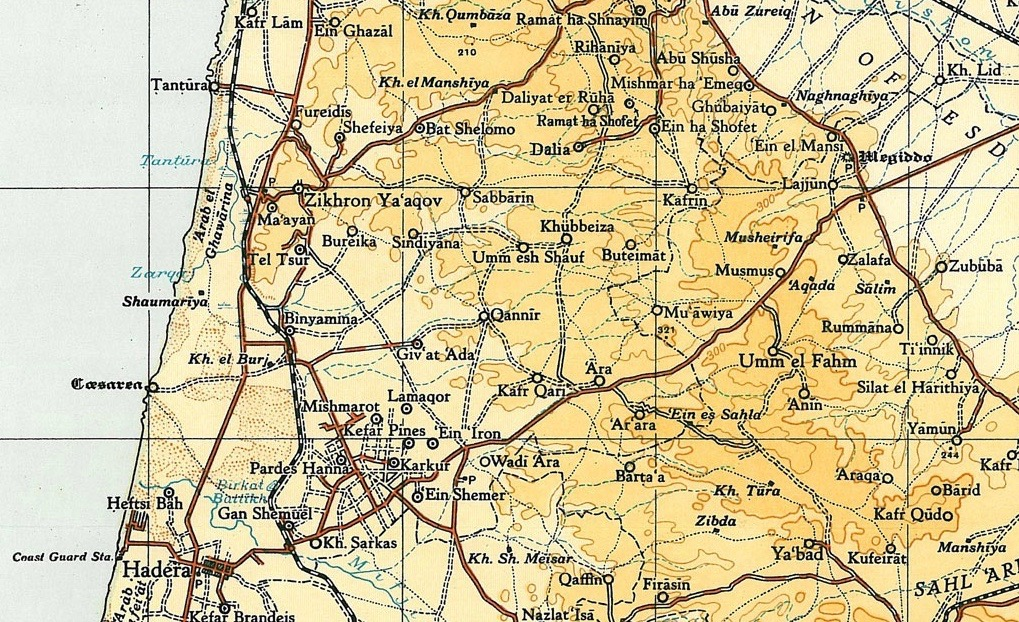
Caesarea 1945 1:250,000

=== 1947–1948 war ===
The civil war in Mandatory Palestine began on 30 November 1947. In December 1947 a village notable, Tawfiq Kadkuda, approached local Jews in an effort to establish a non-belligerency agreement. The 31 January 1948 Lehi attack on a bus leaving Qisarya, which killed two and injured six people, precipitated an evacuation of most of the population, who fled to nearby al-Tantura. The Haganah then occupied the village because the land was owned by the Palestine Jewish Colonization Association and, fearing that the British would force them to leave, decided to demolish the houses. This was done on 19–20 February, after the remaining residents were expelled and the houses were looted. According to Israeli historian Benny Morris, the expulsion of the population had more to do with illegal Jewish immigration than the ongoing civil war. In the same month the 'Arab al Sufsafi and Saidun Bedouin, who inhabited the dunes between Qisarya and Pardes left the area.

=== Israel ===
In 1952, the Jewish town of Caesarea was established 1–2 kilometres (0.62–1.24 mi) to the north of the ruins of the old city, which in 2011 were incorporated into the newly created Caesarea National Park.

In 1992, Palestinian historian Walid Khalidi described the village remains: "Most of the houses have been demolished. The site has been excavated in recent years, largely by Italian, American, and Israeli teams, and turned into a tourist area. Most of the few remaining houses are now restaurants, and the village mosque has been converted into a bar." Since 2000, the site of Caesarea is included in the "Tentative List of World Heritage Places" of the UNESCO.

== Archaeology and reconstruction ==
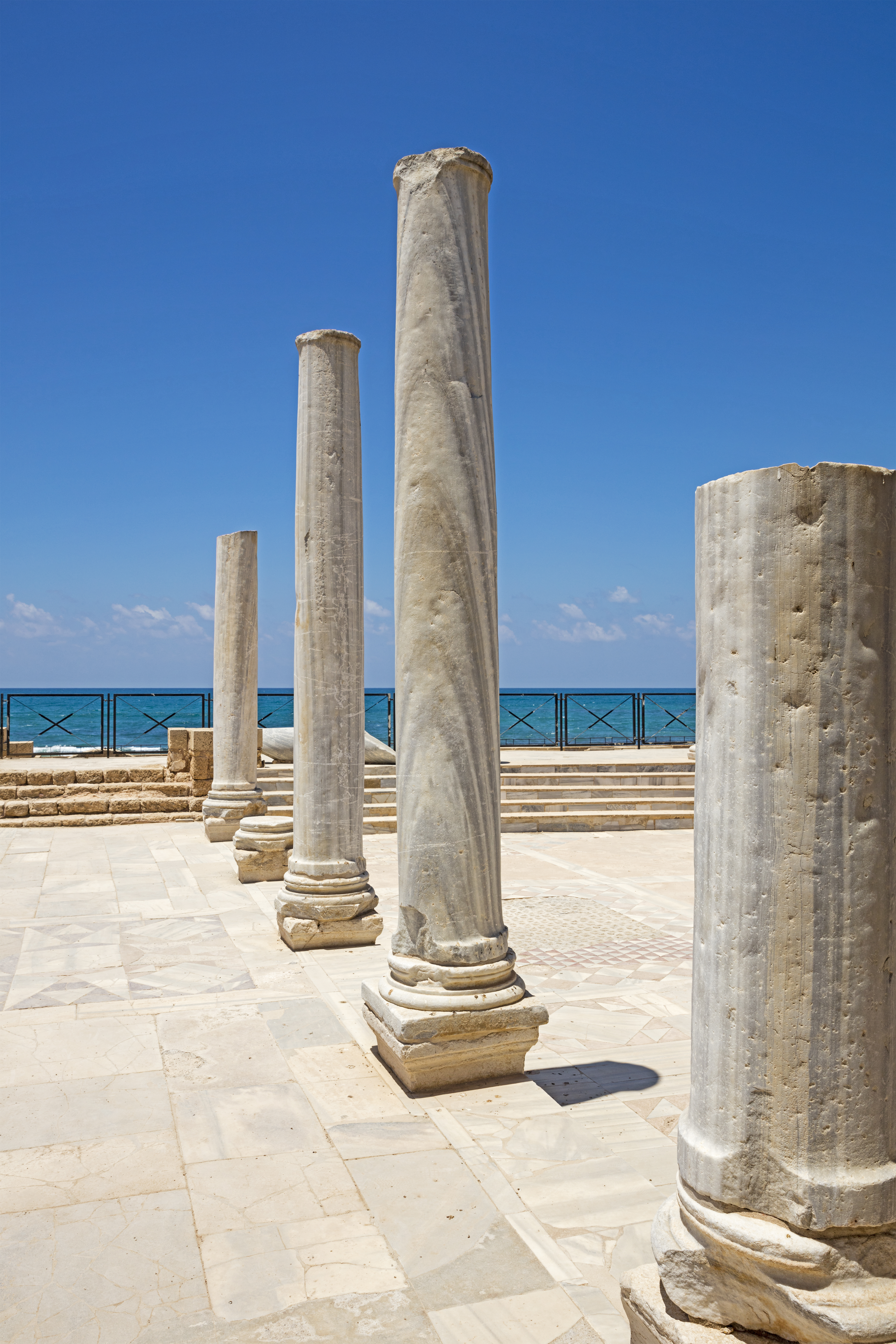
Columns

Large-scale archaeological excavations began in the 1950s and 1960s and continue to this day, conducted by volunteers working under the supervision of archaeologists. The majority of the archaeological excavations are done by the United States and Israel. Remains from many periods have been uncovered, in particular from the large city of the Roman and Byzantine periods and from the fortified town of the Crusaders. Major Classical-era findings are the Roman theatre; a temple dedicated to the goddess Roma and Emperor Augustus; a hippodrome rebuilt in the 2nd century as a more conventional theatre; the Tiberieum, where archaeologists found a reused limestone block with a dedicatory inscription mentioning Pilate the only archaeological find bearing his name and title; a double aqueduct that brought water from springs at the foot of Mount Carmel; a boundary wall; and a 200 ft (60 m) wide moat protecting the harbour to the south and west.

In 1986, the Israel Exploration Society published the archaeological findings of L.I. Levine and E. Netzer, during three seasons of excavations (1975, 1976 and 1979) at Caesarea. In 2010, archaeological surveys-excavations of the site were conducted by Dani Vaynberger and Carmit Gur on behalf of the Israel Antiquities Authority (IAA), and others by Peter Gendelman and Jacob Sharvit on behalf of the IAA, Yosef Porath, Beverly Goodman, and Michal Artzy on behalf of University of Haifa. The site continued to be excavated as late as 2013. A new phase of exploration began in 2018 under the direction of Joseph L. Rife, Phillip Lieberman, and Peter Gendelman on behalf of Vanderbilt University and the IAA.

In February 2015, marine archaeologists and diving club members from the Israel Antiquities Authority announced that about 2,000 gold coins dating back more than 1,000 years had been discovered. According to the researchers, the coins may have been part of a large merchant ship trading with the coastal cities and ports in the Mediterranean, and the coins may have been used to pay the salaries of the Fatimid military garrison. In January 2021, researchers re-examined the coins discovered in 2015, and they retrieved hundreds more. The coins with Arabic text on both sides were 24 carat gold and 95 percent purity.

A large compound, located in the archaeologists' Area CC, in the first insula of the Roman and Byzantine city south of the Crusader wall and close to the sea, along the decumanus, was in use as the Roman praetorium of the equestrian fiscal procurator, and then became the seat of the Byzantine governor. It contained a basilica with an apse, where magistrates would have sat, for the structure was used as a hall of justice, as fragments of inscriptions detailing the fees that court clerks might claim attest.

A rare, colorful mosaic dating from the 2nd-3rd century CE was uncovered in 2018, in the Caesarea National Park near a Crusader bridge. It contains the image of three male figures wearing togas, geometric patterns, as well as a largely damaged inscription in Greek. It is one of the few extant examples of mosaics from that specific time period in Israel. The mosaic measures 3.5 × 8 meters and is, according to its excavators, "of a rare high quality" comparable to that of Israel's finest examples.

In 1962, a team of Israeli and American archaeologists discovered in the sand of Caesarea three small fragments of one Hebrew stone inscription bearing the partial names of places associated with the priestly courses (the rest of which had been reconstructed), dated to the third-fourth centuries. The uniqueness of this discovery is that it shows the places of residence in Galilee of the priestly courses, places presumably resettled by Jews after the First Jewish–Roman War under Hadrian.

The main Byzantine church, an octagonal martyrion, was built in the 6th century and sited directly upon the podium that had supported Herod's temple, as was a widespread Christian practice. The martyrion was richly paved and surrounded by small radiating enclosures. Archaeologists have recovered some foliate capitals that included representations of the Cross. The site would in time be re-occupied, this time by a mosque.

In 2005 excavators found a well-preserved 6th-century panel covered in an exquisite mosaic made of glass gold and coloured opaque glass tesserae, used as a table, patterned with crosses and rosettes. In 2018, a significant hoard of 24 gold coins and a gold earring was unearthed and tentatively dated to 1101.

In 2025, archaeologists from the Israel Antiquities Authority (IAA) and the Caesarea Development Corporation discovered a Roman‑period marble sarcophagus in Caesarea dating to approximately 1,700 years ago. The sarcophagus is depicting a drinking contest between the gods Dionysus and Hercules. In the relief, Hercules is depicted reclining and visibly intoxicated, while Dionysus appears triumphant, accompanied by Maenads, satyrs, and panthers.

=== Aqueducts ===
Several aqueducts were successively built to supply water to Roman and Byzantine Caesarea: the High Aqueduct, the Low Aqueduct and the Southern Pipe. The High Aqueduct brought water from the Carmel foothills northeast of Caesarea, crossing two valleys, Nahal Tanninim and Nahal 'Ada. Five salvage excavations executed between 1994–2002 helped better understand their development, leading to publications by Yosef Porath and others.

The High Aqueduct (or high level aqueduct) preceded the other two. It was in continuous use for circa six centuries, until the city's fall to the Muslim armies in 640/1 CE. It consists of three channels (A–C), constructed in succession, and went through several modifications during its long history. Channel A was the first, followed by Channel B, which was built against Channel A to its right side, with Channel C later replacing Channel B. Both Channel A and B were fed by the 'En Shuni springs (Hebrew: 'Enot Shuni), while Channel C tapped into the higher springs of Nahal Tanninim. Channel C was a gravity channel constructed atop Channel B, with just one segment consisting of a triple pottery pipeline laid at the bottom of Channel B. Where Channel A crosses the Nahal 'Ada valley, a segment was diverted into Channel D.

Channel A was constructed at some point between Herod's inauguration of Caesarea in 10/9 BCE and Hadrian's rule (117–138 CE), archaeological indicators (architecture and initial plaster type) seeming to show that it was erected after Herod's time, probably under the Flavian dynasty (69-96 CE). It was followed under Hadrian by Channel B. It seems that deviation Channel D predates the construction of the artificial water reservoir formed by the Nahal Tanninim Dam. The last stage of the aqueduct was the gravity channel (Channel C2), built to replace the Channel C pipeline.

The Low Aqueduct (or low level aqueduct), which brought water from the Nahal Tanninim reservoir, was probably constructed at the end of the 5th century or beginning of the 6th during the Byzantine period, according to Yeshu Dray who bases his proposal on the letter written by Bishop Procopius of Gaza (c. 465–528)) to Emperor Anastasius I (r. 491–518). Procopius mentions the rehabilitation of the port of Caesarea, leaving a testimony for the Taninim project's date. This contradicts Yosef Porath's 2002 estimate dating the project to the end of the 4th or early 5th century, which was based on circumstantial evidence that only set a terminus post quem. Porath noted that the aqueduct was still in use by the 6th century.

The Southern Pipe (or "pipes aqueduct" on a SWP 1880 map) brought water to Caesarea from the spring of 'En el'Assal on the right (north) bank of Nahal Hadera's lower basin, c. 4 km S-SE of the city. It probably dates back to the 4th century and was built of ceramic pipes coated in concrete on the outside.

During the Crusader period, the smaller Frankish city had to make do with an open canal for its water supply.
