= 5th century in Lebanon =

- Key event(s)
- Christianization of Lebanon
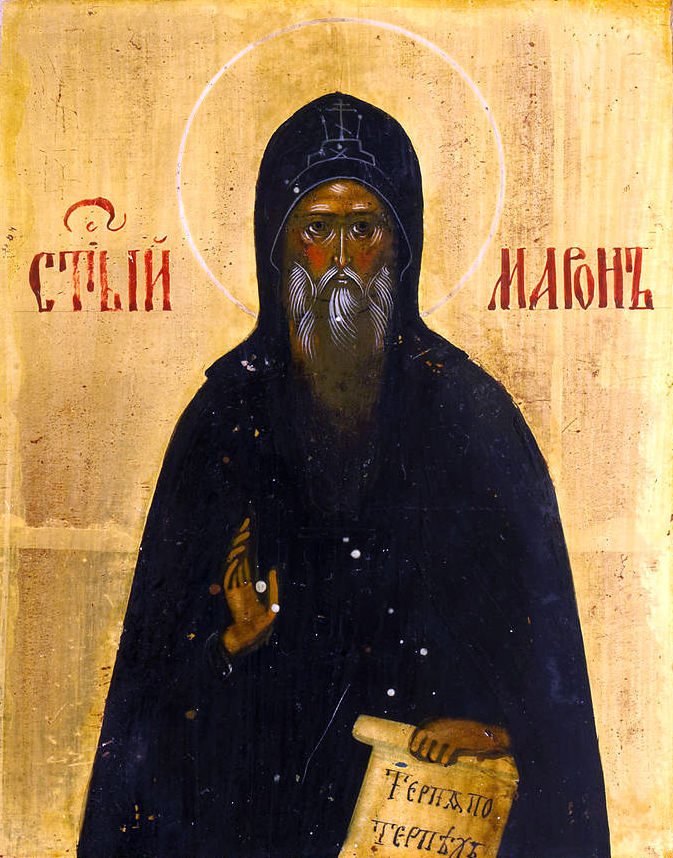
- Icon of Maron, whose followers, after his death, founded a religious Christian movement that became known as the Maronite Church.
- Chronology
- ← 4th century; 5th century; 6th century →

This article lists historical events that occurred between 401–500 in modern-day Lebanon or regarding its people.

== Administration ==
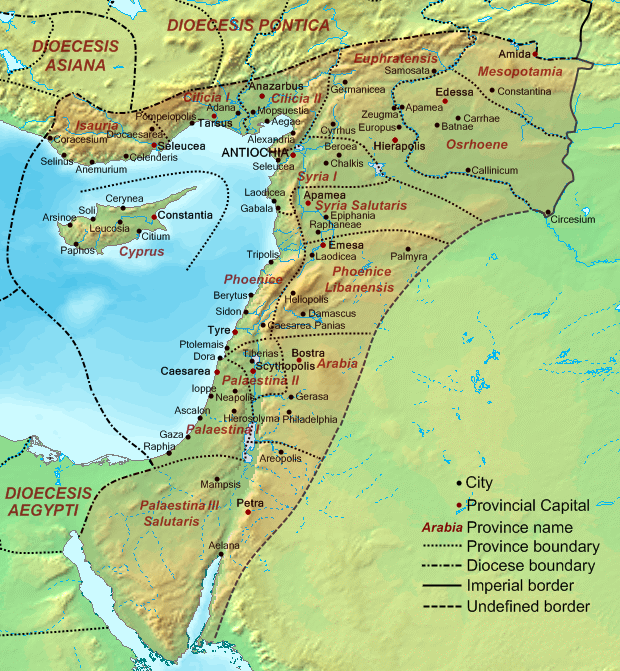
Map of the Diocese of the East with its provinces, as recorded in the Notitia Dignitatum, c. 400

Constantine's province of Augusta Libanensis was short-lived, but formed the basis of the re-division of Phoenice c. 400 into the Phoenice I or Phoenice Paralia (Greek: Φοινίκη Παραλία, "coastal Phoenice"), and Phoenice II or Phoenice Libanensis (Lebanese Phoenicia);(Φοινίκη Λιβανησία), with Tyre and Emesa as their respective capitals. In the Notitia Dignitatum, written shortly after the division, Phoenice I is governed by a consularis, while Libanensis is governed by a praeses, with both provinces under the Diocese of the East. Only two governors of Phoenice were known from the reign of Theodosius II (408–450) to that of Justin I (518–527).

== Culture ==
Chariot racing in Berytus was documented by Zacharias of Mytilene in his Life of Severus around 487–488 CE. Additionally, a statue base from Constantinople indicates that the renowned charioteer Porphyrius competed in Berytus during the late fifth century.

== Events ==
=== 400s ===
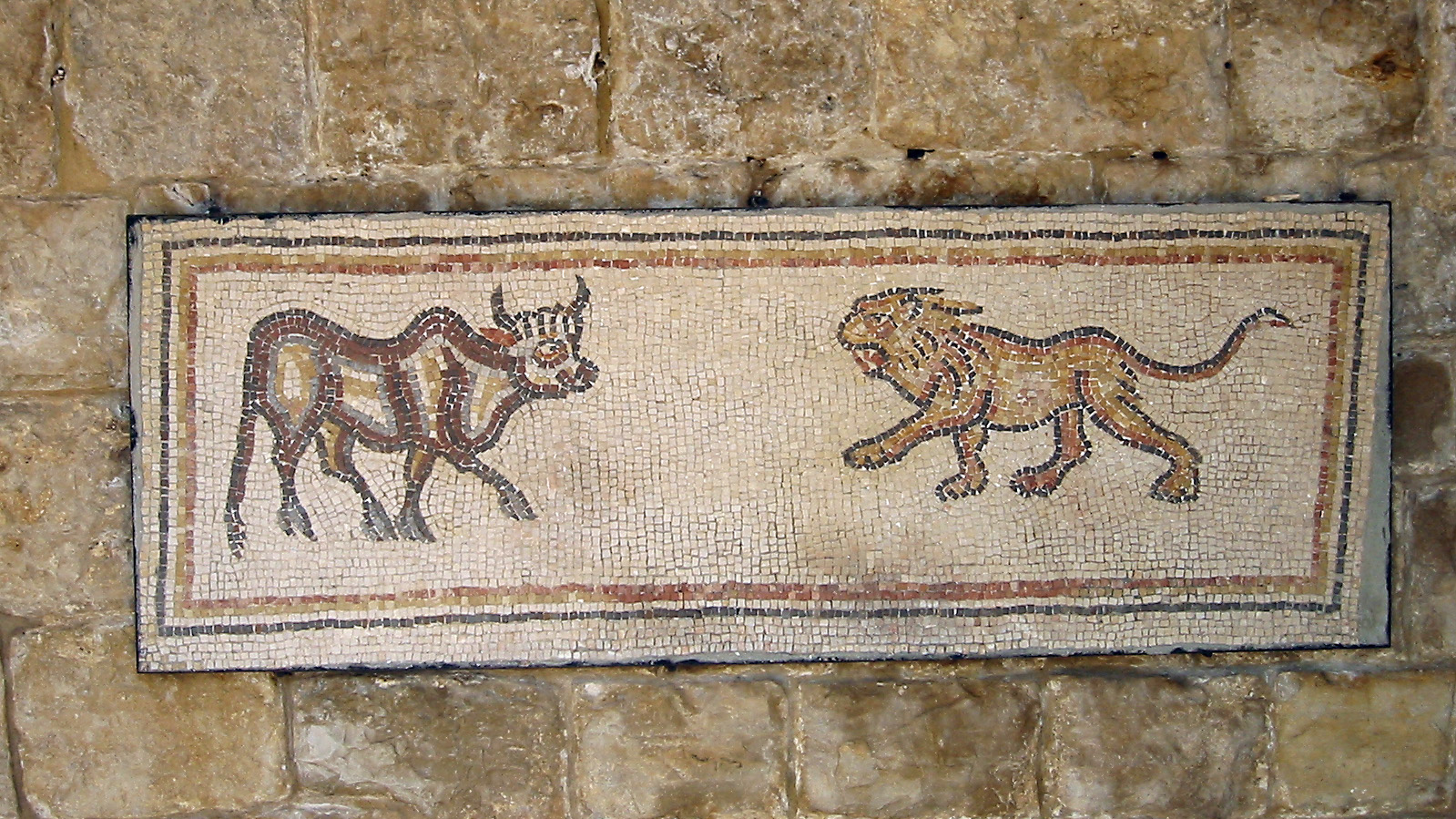
5th century bull mosaic in the Beiteddine palace.

- Around the year 400, Rabbula, the future bishop of Edessa, attempts to have himself martyred by interrupting and disrupting the pagans of Baalbek but he was only thrown down the temple stairs along with his companion.
- A village featuring a luxurious building with Roman thermal baths and two large winepresses is established in the modern region of Zaarour, c. 400.
- In 404 AD, towards the end of the reign of Arcadius, numerous Isaurian robbers gather in great numbers and ravage cities and villages as far as Phoenicia.
- John Chrysostom writes to Maron around AD 405 expressing his great love and respect, and asking him to pray for him.

=== 410s ===
- The Christianization of Lebanon begins. The followers of Maron (a Syriac Christian hermit monk who practiced his religion in the Taurus Mountains) put a foundation to the religious Christian movement after his death in 410 AD that became known as the Syriac Maronite Church, in full communion with the Holy See and the Catholic Church. The peoples who belong to the religious community which developed from this movement are the modern Maronites.

=== 420s ===
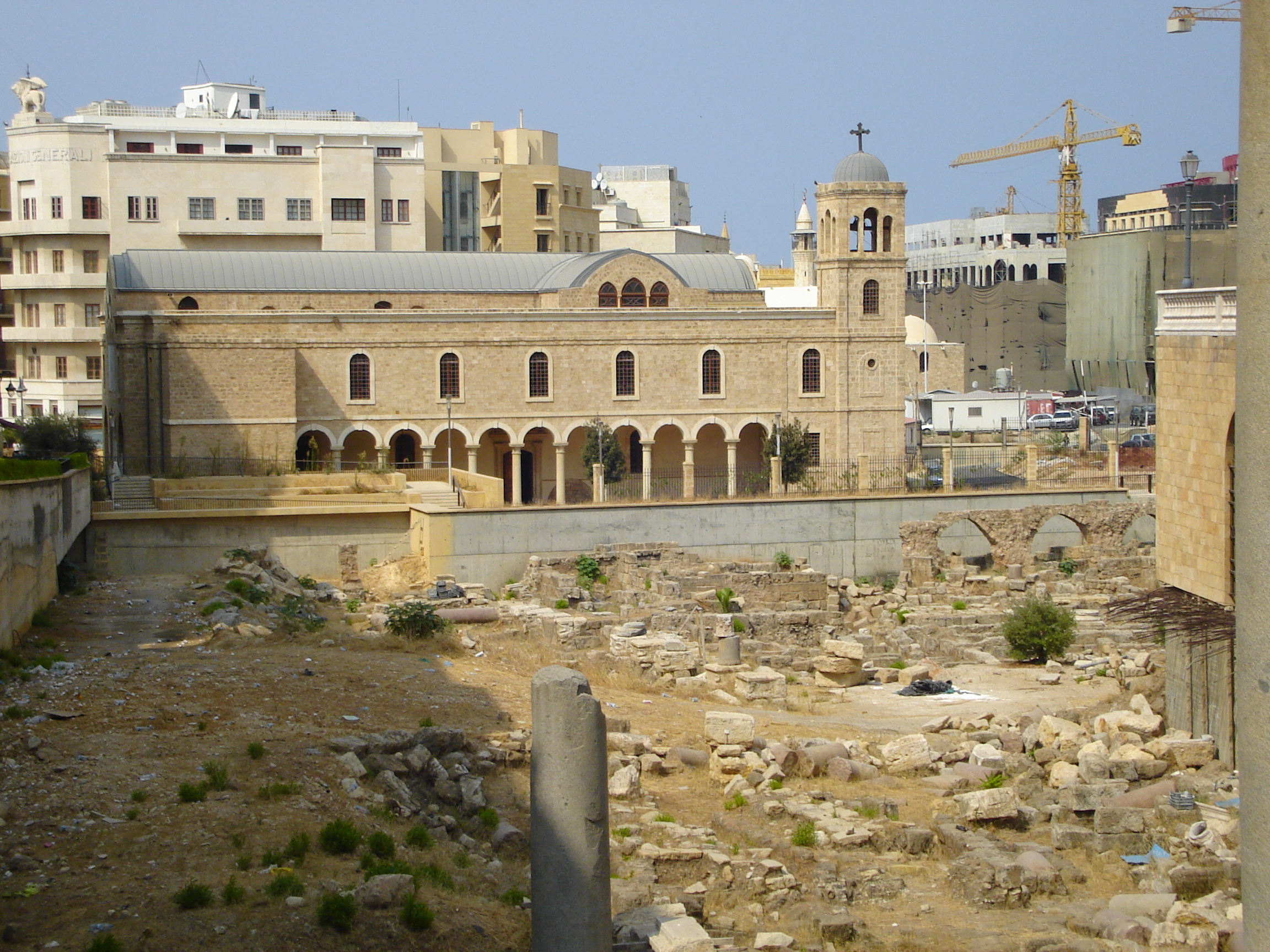
Roman ruins of Berytus, in front of Saint George Greek Orthodox Cathedral in modern-day Beirut.

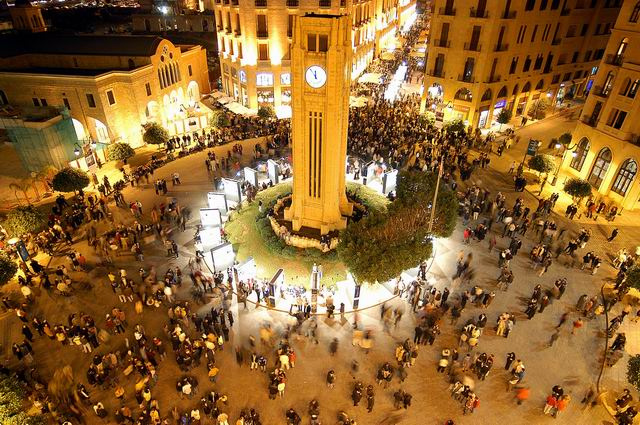
The school's exact location is uncertain, but it is thought to have lain just north of Nejmeh Square (pictured), next to the Saint George Greek Orthodox Cathedral.

- By the 5th century, the law school of Berytus had established its leading position and repute among the Empire's law schools; its teachers were highly regarded and played a chief role in the development of legal learning in the East to the point that they were dubbed “ecumenical masters”. From 425, the law school of Constantinople becomes a rival center of law study.

=== 430s ===
- Marcellinus, bishop of Arqa, participates at the Council of Ephesus in 431. in which Cyrus, bishop of Tyre (?–431), is deposed as a supporter of Nestorius. and Berenicianus is ordained as his successor as the bishop of Tyre. (431–?)

=== 440s ===
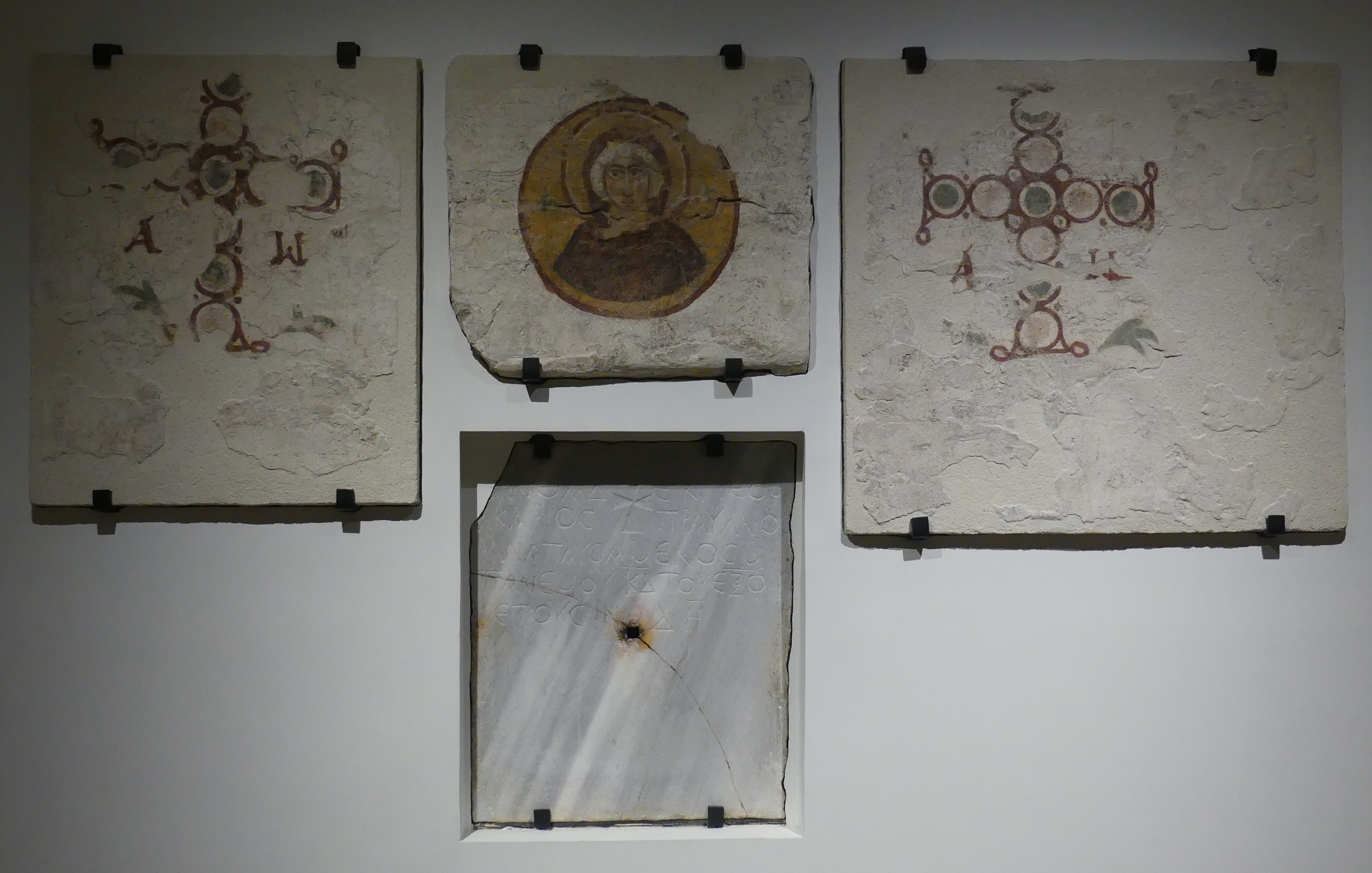
From Al Bass, dated 440: "possibly the oldest fresco of the Virgin Mary worldwide." (National Museum, Beirut)

- In 440, Anatolius (Greek: Ανατόλιος, fl. 421 – 451) a diplomat and general of the Eastern Roman Empire and Consul directs some works at the Heliopolis of Phoenicia.
- In the summer of 2017 a Greek inscription, five-metres long, naming Irenaeus as bishop of Tyre, was found west of the Sea of Galilee. Since the inscription provides the date of the church's completion as 445, it gives credence to a date as early as 444 CE for his ordination.
- Epiphanius, bishop of Arqa, takes part in a synod at Antioch in 448.
- A council is held in Tyre, February, 449, to discuss and examine the nestorian beliefs of Ibas, Bishop of Edessa. This council had serious consequences at Chalcedon and especially at the Council of the Three Chapters in 553.

=== 450s ===
- in 450 AD Berytus obtains from Theodosius II the title of metropolis, with jurisdiction over six sees taken from Tyre.
- Heraclitus, bishop of Arqa, Porphyrius, a bishop from Batroun, and Thomas, the bishop of Porphyreon (Jieh), participate in the Council of Chalcedon, 451 AD, in which the Maronites reject miaphysitisim and maintain full communion with the then united Orthodox Catholic Church. It's also decided in the council to restore the jurisdiction of the six sees Berytus obtained, back to Tyre, leaving, however, to Berytus its rank of metropolis. Thus, from 451 AD Berytus is an exempt metropolis which depends directly on the Patriarch of Antioch.

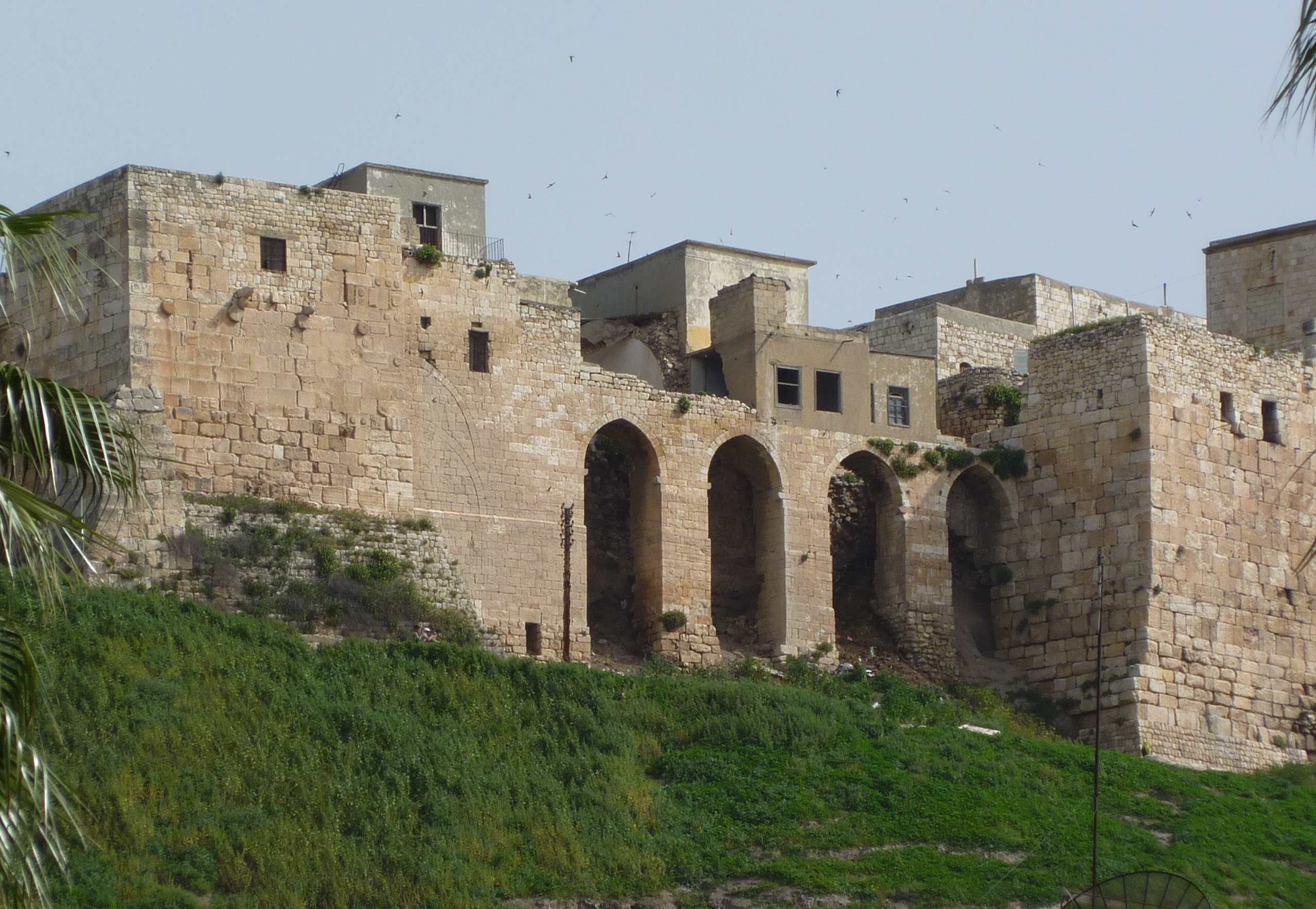
View of the Qalaat al-Madiq fortress, 2010

- In 452, after the Council of Chalcedon, the Maronite Beth-Maron monastery at Apamea (present day Qalaat al-Madiq) get expanded by the Byzantine emperor Marcian.
- Heraclitus, bishop of Arqa, signs the letter that the bishops of the province of Syria Phoenicia sent in 458 to Byzantine Emperor Leo I the Thracian to protest about the murder of Proterius of Alexandria.

=== 460s ===
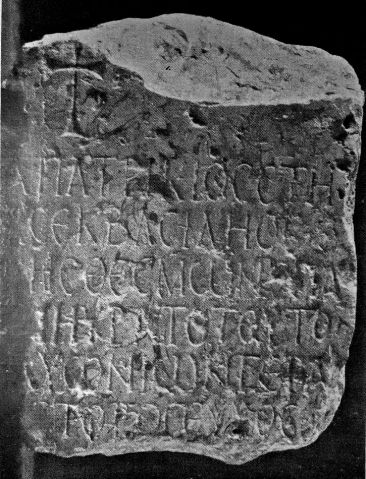
Limestime statue base with ancient Greek inscription mentioning Patricius, a well known jurist who taught in the law school of Berytus. The base was unearthed in 1906 in Beirut. Has disappeared since 1925.

- In 460 AD, the emperor Leo I issues an edict that orders candidates for the bar of the Eastern praetorian prefecture to produce certificates of proficiency from the law teachers who instruct them at one of the recognized law schools of the Empire. As a result, learning law at the law school of Berytus becomes highly desired.

=== 470s ===
- John II Codonatus, archbishop of Tyre, becomes patriarch of Antioch (477).
- A mosaic from Upper Galilee, then part of Phoenice Paralios (Maritima), is completed on 16 April 478 in the celebration of the visit of Longinus, the archbishop of Tyre and several other ecclesiastical figures on the first Sunday after Easter.

=== 480s ===
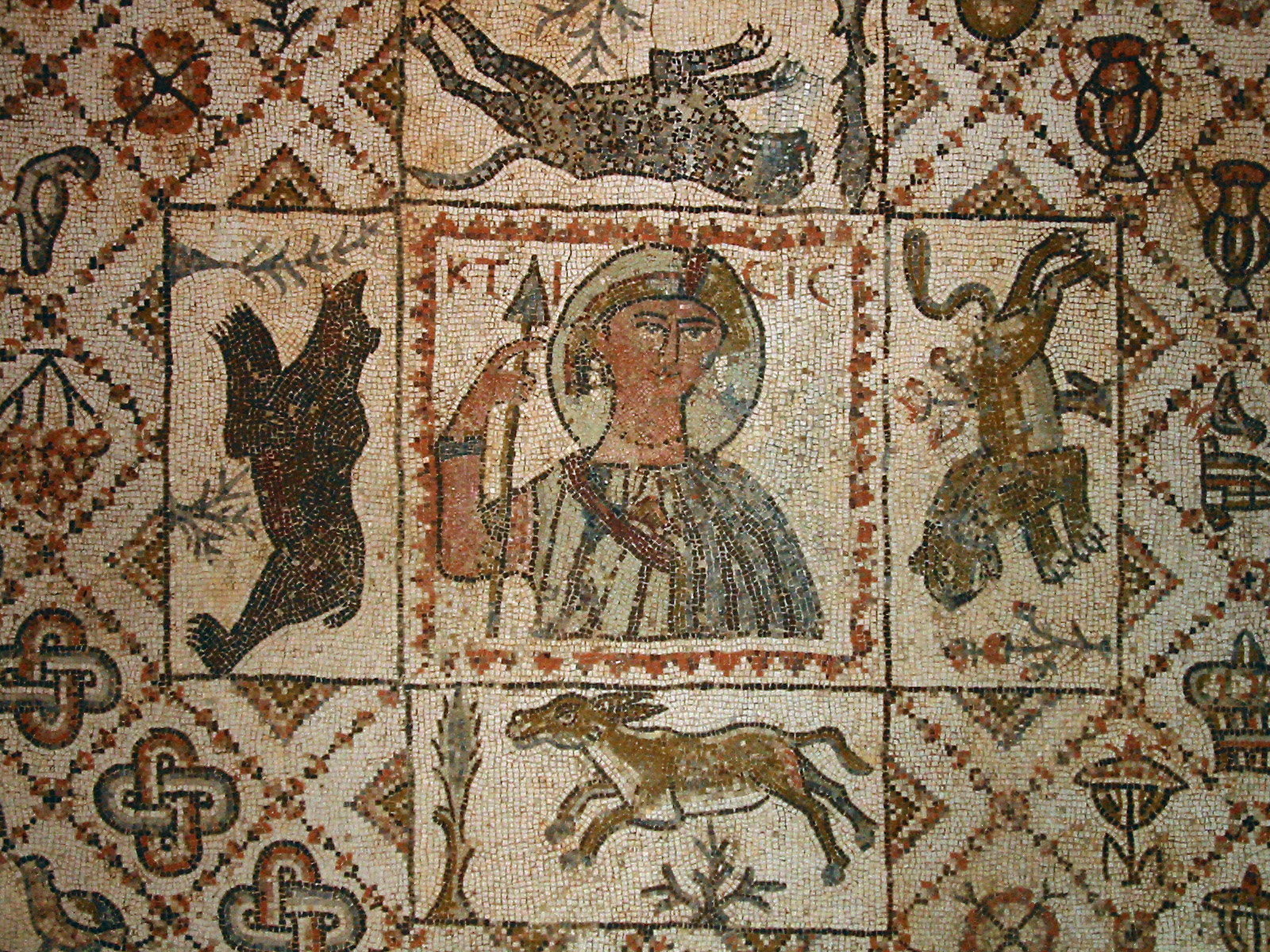
5th century mosaic of the goddess Ktisis from the Beiteddine Palace.

- The synod of Sidon is convened in 486 AD.
- The Metropolitan of Tyre establishes himself as the first in precedence (protothronos) of all the Metropolitans subject to Antioch.
- In 487, Zacharias Rhetor travels to Berytus to study law at its law school. He stayed there, and led an ascetic life.
- In 488, Severus of Antioch is baptised at the Church of Saint Leontius at Tripolis (modern-day Tripoli) with Evagrius as his sponsor.

=== 490s ===
- In 491/492, during the reign of Anastasius I, Lakhmid Arabs invade Phoenicia Libanensis, reaching as far as Emesa.
- The collatio lustralis tax is abolished by Anastasius I throughout the Eastern Roman Empire in the year 498 as part of his fiscal and monetary reforms, relieving economically all merchants, money-lenders, and craftsmen.

== Religion ==
=== Ecclesiastical administration ===
The ecclesiastical administration paralleled the political, but with some differences. When the province was divided c. 400, Damascus, rather than Emesa, became the metropolis of Phoenice II. Both provinces belonged to the Patriarchate of Antioch, with Damascus initially outranking Tyre, whose position was also briefly challenged by the see of Berytus c. 450; after 480/1, however, the Metropolitan of Tyre established himself as the first in precedence (protothronos) of all the Metropolitans subject to Antioch.

== People ==
Professors:

Dates of service (uncertain dates in italic)	Names (uncertain names in italic)
400–410, 438	Cyrillus
420–450	Patricius
450–490	Domninus
450–490	Demosthenes
450–490	Eudoxius
May–June 460	Euxenius
480–500	Amblichus
Before 487/488 –	Leontius
End of the 5th century, early 6th century	Sabinus
End of the 5th century, early 6th century	Anonymous, mentioned in the Scholia Sinaitica

== Architecture ==
- Hamatoura monastery (Arabic: دَيْر رُقَاد ٱلسَّيِّدَة حَمَاطُورَة), Kousba.
- Anastasi Romano-Byzantine Cathedral, modern-day Nejmeh Square, Beirut.
- Church of the Theotokos, Berytus (Beirut), city center, beside the port.
- Church of Saint Judas, Beirut.
- Martyrion of Saint Stephen, Beirut.
- A Christian basilica with columns built towards the end of the 5th century, Yanouh.
- Saint-Zakhia church, near Amsheet.
- A Christian basilica with mosaics, dated to AD 498, Shheem.

== Bibliography ==
- Hall, Linda Jones (2004). Roman Berytus: Beirut in Late Antiquity. Routledge. ISBN 978-1-134-44013-9.
- Jolowicz, Herbert F. (1972). Historical Introduction to the Study of Roman Law. Cambridge, Cambs.: Cambridge University Press. ISBN 9780521082532.
- Mousourakis, George (2003). The Historical Institutional Context of Roman Law. Burlington, VT: Ashgate Publishing. ISBN 9780754621089.
- Collinet, Paul (1925). Histoire de l'école de droit de Beyrouth (in French). Paris: Société Anonyme du Recueil Sirey.
- Riddle, John M. (2008). A History of the Middle Ages, 300–1500. Plymouth: Rowman & Littlefield Publishers. ISBN 9781442210042.
- Paturel, Simone (2019-07-01). Baalbek-Heliopolis, the Bekaa, and Berytus from 100 BCE to 400 CE. BRILL. doi:10.1163/9789004400733. ISBN 978-90-04-40073-3.
- Cook, Arthur B. (1914). "(Band 1): Zeus god of the bright sky". Zeus: a study in ancient religion. Cambridge: The University Press.
- Eißfeldt, Otto (1941). "Phoiniker (Phoinike)". Realencyclopädie der Classischen Altertumswissenschaft. Vol. Band XX, Halbband 39, Philon–Pignus. pp. 350–379.
