= List of students at the law school of Berytus =

List of students at the Roman law school of Berytus

Extant ancient texts provide a list of the names of 51 students who attended the Law school of Berytus; these students came from twenty different Roman provinces. Some of those students were deemed notable and achieved fame.

Below is a list compiled by French scholar Paul Collinet; it includes the provinces and known cities from which each student originated.

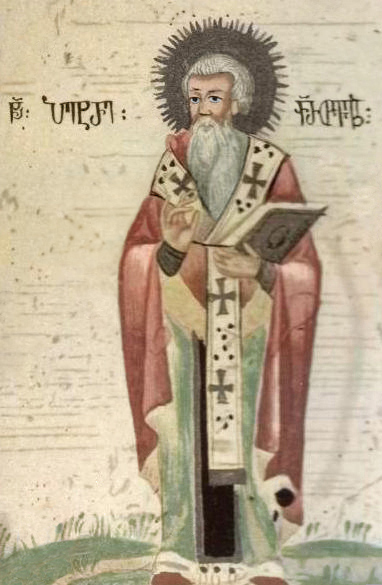
Icon of Peter of Iberia

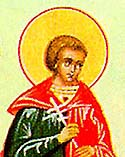
Saint Amphian

Provinces	Cities	Student names (listed in chronological order)
Arabia		Severin and unnamed others Theodorus
Armenia		Anonymous (mentioned in Zacharias' "Life of Severus")
Asia	Tralles	Chrysaorius
Bythinia		Flavianus
Cappadocia	Caesarea	Menas
Asia	Aphrodisias	Athanasius
Cilicia	Tarsus	Peregrinus
Egypt	Alexandria	Anonymous? (in De opificio mundi); Anatolius; Athanasius; Isidorus
Egypt	Heliopolis	Asclepiodotus
Euphratensis	Samosata	Evagrius
Thrace	Constantinople	Apringius; Arcadius; John
Achaia	Euboea	Anonymous (In Libanius ep.1062); Hilarinus
Iberia		Peter
Macedonia	Thessalonica	George
Lycia	Paga	Amphianus; Aedesius
Lycia	Patara	Philip; Elyseus
Osroene	Edessa	Anastasius
Palestine	Gaza	Lucius; Zacharias; Zenodorus; Orion; Zosimus; Macarius; Sozomen
Palestine	Maiuma	Zacharias; John; John Rufus
Palestine	Ascalon	Theodore; Evagrius; Stephen
Pamphylia		Palladius
Phoenice	Berytus	Pamphilus; Anatolius (Azutrio); Priscianus; Celsinus; Julianus; Constantinus; Eudoxius; Leontius; Anatolius (professor)
Phoenice	Tyre	Gaianus
Pisidia	Sozopolis	Severus
Syria	Antioch	Artemon; Hermogenes; Paeoninus; Silvanus

== Notable students ==
Extant ancient texts provide a list of the names of 51 students who attended the law school of Beirut; these students came from twenty different Roman provinces. Some of those students were deemed notable and achieved fame.

In his 238 AD Panegyric to Christian scholar Origen of Alexandria, Cappadocian bishop Gregory Thaumaturgus relates taking extensive Latin and Roman law courses in Berytus.

According to Eusebius of Caesarea, Pamphilus of Caesarea was born into a rich family in Beirut in the latter half of the 3rd century and attended its law school. Pamphilus later became the presbyter of Caesarea Maritima and the founder of its extensive Christian library. He is celebrated as a martyr by both the Roman Catholic Church and the Eastern Orthodox Church. Eusebius also tells of martyred brothers Amphian and Aedesius, born to a noble Lycian family. They converted to Christianity while studying law in Beirut and were persecuted and executed for their beliefs.

Fourth-century historian Eunapius wrote of Anatolius, a high-ranking Roman official known to his enemies as Azutrio. Anatolius occupied the offices of consul of Syria, vicarius of the Diocese of Asia, proconsul of Constantinople, urban prefect of Constantinople in 354, and Praetorian prefect of Illyricum until his death in 360. In his account of Anatolius, Eunapius summarized: "He reached the summit of the science of law. Nothing about this is surprising because Beirut, his homeland, is the mother and nurse of these studies". Libanius' correspondence with Gaianus of Tyre discusses the latter's achievements after his graduation from the law school of Berytus; Gaianus became the consular governor of Phoenicia in 362. Gazan lawyer and church historian Sozomen, also a law student at Beirut, wrote in his Historia Ecclesiastica about Triphyllius, a convert to Christendom who became the bishop of Nicosia. Triphyllius received legal training in Beirut and was criticized by his teacher Saint Spyridon for his atticism and for using legal vocabulary instead of that of the Bible.

Zacharias Rhetor studied law at Beirut between 487 and 492, then worked as a lawyer in Constantinople until his imperial contacts won him the appointment as bishop of Mytilene. Among Rhetor's works is the biography of Severus, the last miaphysite patriarch of Antioch and one of the founders of the Syriac Orthodox Church, who had also been a law student in Beirut as of 486. Another late 5th-century student was John Rufus, an anti-Chalcedonian priest who moved to Maiuma after the expulsion of his master, Peter the Fuller. In Maiuma, John Rufus authored the Plerophoriae and the Life of Peter the Iberian.

== Bibliography ==
- Collinet, Paul (1925). Histoire de l'école de droit de Beyrouth (in French). Paris: Société Anonyme du Recueil Sirey.
- Eunapius of Sardis (1596). Bioi philosophon kai sophiston (Lives of the Sophists) (in Greek). Hieronymum Commelinum.
- Greatrex, Geoffrey; Sebastian P. Brock; Witold Witakowski, eds. (2011). The Chronicle of Pseudo-Zachariah Rhetor: Church and War in Late Antiquity. Translated by Robert R. Phenix and Cornelia B. Horn. Liverpool: Liverpool University Press. ISBN 9781846314933.
- McNamee, Kathleen (1998). "Another chapter in the history of scholia*". The Classical Quarterly. 48 (1): 269–288. doi:10.1093/cq/48.1.269. ISSN 1471-6844.
- Sterk, Andrea (2009). Renouncing the World Yet Leading the Church: The Monk-Bishop in Late Antiquity. Cambridge, Mass.: Harvard University Press. ISBN 9780674044012.
- Thaumaturgus, Gregory (1873) [239]. "Oratio Panegyrica ad Originem" [The Oration and Panegyric Addressed to Origen] (PDF). In Philip Schaff (ed.). Ante-Nicene Fathers. Vol. 6. Translated by S. D. F. Salmond. Edinburgh: Christian Classics Etheral Library.
