= List of professors at the law school of Berytus =

List of professors at the Roman law school of Berytus

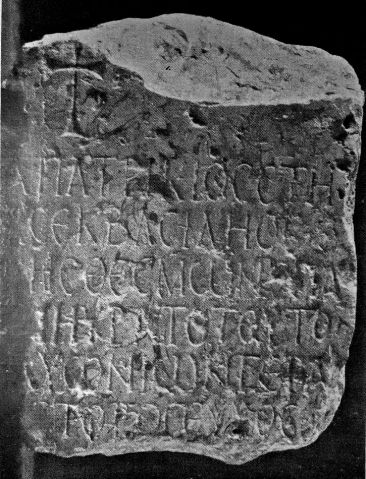
Base of possibly funerary statue of Patricius, found in Beirut.

Extant ancient texts provide a list of the names and deeds of some of the law school of Berytus's professorial body. Seven of the most notable Berytus (modern Beirut) professors were styled "Ecumenical Masters"; they were largely responsible for the revival of legal education in the Eastern Roman Empire. Beirut law school professors were involved in drafting parts of Justinian's Corpus Juris Civilis, namely the Digest and the Institutes.

The scarce sources include historical accounts, works of legal scholarship, anthologies, ancient correspondences and funerary inscriptions. Below is a list that includes the dates of service of each of the identified law professors:

Dates (uncertain dates in italic)	Names (uncertain names in italic)
Summer 356 to March / April 364	Domninus (Domnio)
October 363	Scylacius
Summer 365	Anonymous
Summer 388	Sebastianus?
400–410, 438	Cyrillus
420–450	Patricius
450–490	Domninus
450–490	Demosthenes
450–490	Eudoxius
May–June 460	Euxenius
480–500	Amblichus
Before 487/488 –	Leontius
End of the 5th century, early 6th century	Sabinus
End of the 5th century, early 6th century	Anonymous, mentioned in the Scholia Sinaitica
21 November 533, 16 December 533	Dorotheus
16 November 534 – around 565	
16 December 533	Anatolius
6th century	Thaleleus
6th century	Isidorus
6th century	Stephen
? – 551	Julian

== Notable professors ==
Antioch-based rhetoric teacher Libanius wrote many letters of correspondence to Domninus the Elder, a 4th-century law school professor. In 360, Libanius invited Domninus to leave Beirut and teach with him at the rhetoric school of Antioch. Domninus apparently declined the offer, since later correspondence to him from Libanius, between 361 and 364, served as recommendations for law school candidates.

The most brilliant era of Beirut's law school, spanning the century between 400 and 500, was known as the era of the "Ecumenical Masters" (Greek: τῆς οἰκουμένης διδάσκαλοι). During this period, a succession of seven highly esteemed law masters was largely responsible for the revival of legal education in the Eastern Roman Empire. The seven revered masters, cited with praise by 6th-century scholars, were Cyrillus, Patricius, Domninus, Demosthenes, Eudoxius, Leontius and Amblichus.

Cyrillus was the founder of the ecumenical school of jurists. He is believed to have taught as of c. 400 or c. 410. Styled "the great" due to his reputation as a teacher, he was known for his direct use of ancient sources of law and for interpreting jurists such as Ulpian and Papinian. Cyrillus wrote a precise treatise on definitions that supplied the materials for many important scholia appended to the first and second titles of the eleventh book of the Basilica. Patricius was praised in the third preface of the Justinian Digest (Tanta-Dedoken) as a distinguished professor of the Beirut law school. Archaeological excavations done in Beirut at the turn of the 20th century revealed a funerary monument believed to have belonged to Patricius. The son of Eudoxius, Leontius was described by ecclesiastical historian Zacharias Rhetor, who was his first-year student in 487 or 488, to have a great reputation in the legal field. He was raised to the office of Praetorian prefect of the East under Emperor Anastasius I between 503 and 504, and became Magister militum in 528. Leontius was also involved as a commissioner in the preparation of the first codex of Justinian. His contemporary, Amblichus, wrote a commentary on Ulpian's Libri ad Edictum.

Historical sources also tell of Euxenius, a teacher at the Beirut law school who taught during the times of the "Ecumenical Masters". Euxenius was the brother of the city's bishop Eustathius and was involved in the 460 religious controversy caused by Timothy Aelurus, which opposed the Miaphysites to the followers of the Council of Chalcedon.

Several Beirut professors contributed to the Corpus Juris Civilis, a fundamental work in Roman jurisprudence. Dorotheus, Anatolius (son of Leontius) and Julianus were school professors contemporary to Justinian I. The first two were summoned to the imperial court and commissioned to draft the Digesta. Under the supervision of Tribonian, Dorotheus also collaborated with Theophilus, a Constantinopolitan law teacher, in drafting the Institutiones. Julianus, the last known professor of Beirut's law school, was extolled by Theaetetus as "the light of the law". After the massive 551 Beirut earthquake, Julianus left Beirut and settled in Constantinople, where he authored the Epitome Iuliani in 555.

Under Justinian, there were eight teachers in the law schools of the Byzantine Empire, presumably four in each of Beirut and Constantinople's schools. Justinian mandated the supervision and enforcement of discipline in the school of Beirut to the teachers, the city's bishop and the governor of Phoenicia Maritima.

== Bibliography ==
- Collinet, Paul (1925). Histoire de l'école de droit de Beyrouth (in French). Paris: Société Anonyme du Recueil Sirey.
- Jalabert, Louis (1906). "Inscriptions grecques et latines de Syrie". Mélanges de la Faculté orientale de l'Université Saint-Joseph à Beyrouth (in French). 1 (36). Beirut: 132–188. doi:10.3406/mefao.1906.891. hdl:2027/njp.32101059308591.
- Jolowicz, Herbert F. (1972). Historical Introduction to the Study of Roman Law. Cambridge, Cambs.: Cambridge University Press. ISBN 9780521082532.
- Kassir, Samir; M. B. DeBevoise (2010). Beirut. Berkeley: University of California Press. ISBN 9780520256682.
- Justinian I; Emperor of the East (534). The Digest of Justinian. Translated by Charles H. Monro. Cambridge, Cambs.: Cambridge University Press (published September 24, 1872). Archived from the original (PDF) on August 17, 2013.
- Pringsheim, Fritz (1921). 'Beryt und Bologna' in Festschrift für Otto Lenel zum fünfzigjährigen Doctorjubiläum am 16. dezember 1921: überreicht von der Rechts- und Staatswissenschaftlichen Fakultät der Universität Freiburg i. Br (in German). Ann Arbor, Mich.: University of Michigan Library.
