= 6th century in Lebanon =

- Key event(s)
- 551 Beirut earthquake, joint dux administration
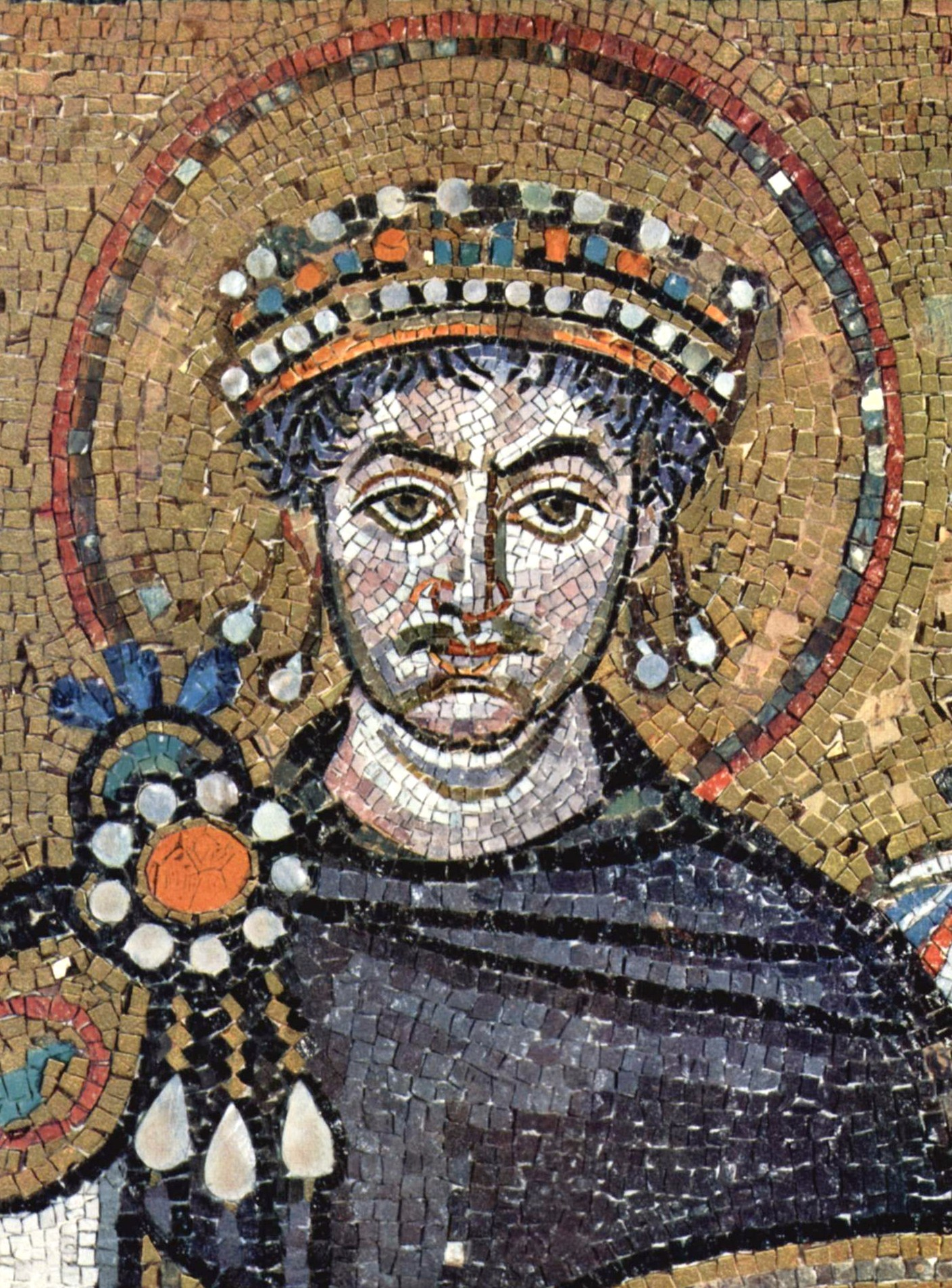
- The Beirut earthquake occurred during the reign of Justinian I (pictured) as Eastern Roman emperor.
- Chronology
- ← 5th century; 6th century; 7th century →

This article lists historical events that occurred between 501–600 in modern-day Lebanon or regarding its people.

== Administration ==
=== Provincial administration ===
Due to mass administrative reforms and edicts directed at Phoenice Libanensis (lit. 'Lebanese Phoenicia') with the goal of preventing further pro-Sassanid raids and invasions, the province was now ruled by two ducēs during the reign of Justinian I.

== Events ==
=== 500s ===
- In 502, Tyre suffers from an earthquake.

=== 510s ===
- A synod is convened in Sidon, 511/512.
- Elias, native of Batroun, is a Greek Orthodox bishop around 512.
- Theodorus becomes the vindex (vindicator) of Tripolis, (modern day Tripoli) 513 AD.
- On 514 or 515, in Tyre is held a council under the presidency of Severus, Patriarch of Antioch, and of Philoxenus, metropolitan of Hierapolis, and which assemble the bishops of the provinces of Antioch, Apamaea, Augusta Euphratensis, Osrhoene, Mesopotamia, Arabia, and Phoenicia Libanensis. It rejects the Council of Chalcedon, and the Henoticon of the Emperor Zeno is explained in a sense clearly contradictory to the latter council.
- In 517 AD, a conflict between the Chalcedonian Maronites and the Miaphysite Jacobite Syriacs causes the ambushment and subsequent massacre perpetrated by the Miaphysites of over 350 Maronite monks and their followers in Qalaat Semaan while they were on their way to St. Simon's Monastery.
- Theodore is bishop of Porphyreon (Jieh), 518 AD.
- Epiphanius, bishop of Tyre, is mentioned in 518 AD.
- After 518, the monastery of Maron de facto administers many parishes in Syria Prima, Cole Syria and Phoenicia.
- Correspondence concerning the massacre of the 350 Maronite monks due to their Chalcedonian belief results in papal and orthodox recognition, indicated by a letter from Pope Hormisdas (514–523) dated 10 February 518.

=== 520s ===
- In 527, Arab raids begin against the inhabitants of Phoenicia Libanensis.
- Justinian I starts a mass reorganization in 527 of the military of Phoenicia Libanensis by appointing an additional dux (Roman military leader). Subsequently, the province now has two ducēs. The dux of the province was expected to prevent further pro-Persian raids and to also protect the Holy City.
- Phoenician ducēs participate in punitive expedition alongside three Arab Phylarches (Pro-Roman Arab sheikhs) against the pro-Sassanid Arab Al-Mundhir, 528 AD.
- In the winter of 528 AD, Justinian I writes to the duces of Phoenice, Bouzes and his brother, Coutzes, and to the duces of Arabia and Mesopotamia and to the phylarchs of the provinces to go after Al-Mundhir and pursue him and his army.
- Justinian I closes down the law schools of Alexandria, Caesarea Maritima and Athens in 529 because their teachings contradict those of the Christian faith, subsequently, the law school of Berytus and Constantinople are now the only law schools maintained during the reign of Justinian I.

=== 530s ===
- In 533 AD, the law school of Berytus is bestowed with the title Berytus Nutrix Legum (Beirut, Mother of Laws) by the Emperor Justinian I in his Omnem constitution.
- in 535-536, the civil governors of Phoenice Libanensis receive salary increases and the title of moderator as part of a reorganization of the government, with the Phoenician moderator receiving 750 gold solidi.
- Representatives from Beth-Maron participate in the Constantinople synod of 536 during the reign of Justinian the Great.
- Christophorus is bishop of Porphyreon, (Jieh), 536 AD.
- Justinian I announces the edict 4 in May 536 AD, directed towards administrative reforms towards Phoenicia Libanensis. In the edict, Tribonian, a jurist, specifies the phylarchs' rank after mentioning that of the duces.

=== 540s ===
- In 541 AD, anxiety arises amongst the two duces of Lebanon out of fear that Al-Mundhir might ravages the frontier of their province while they are away during the cooperation between the military frontier of Arethas, a pro-Byzantine Ghassanid Arab, (who previously was the only one fighting Al Mundhir) with the Phoenician military.

=== 550s ===
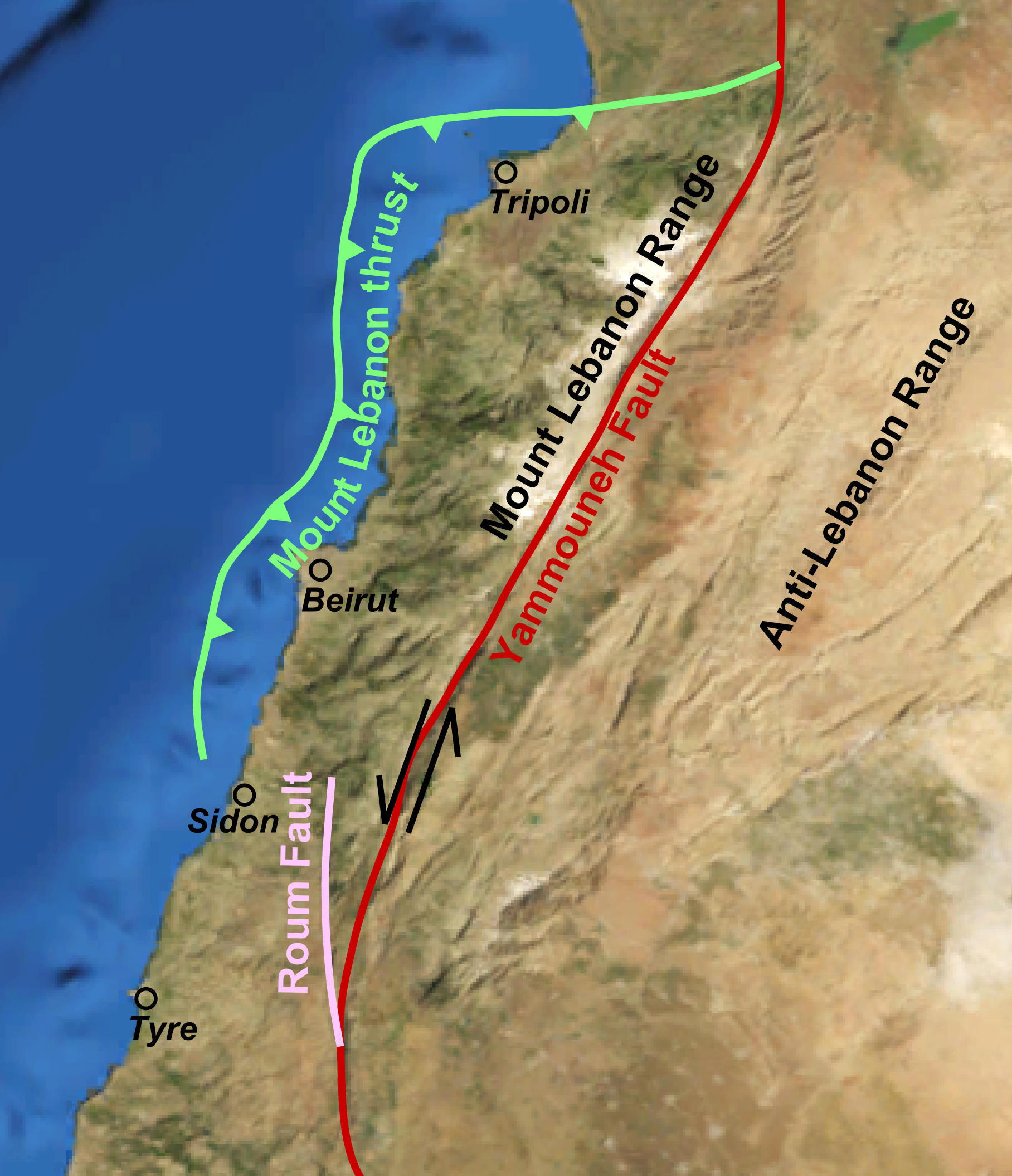
Main tectonic features of Lebanon

- The 551 Beirut earthquake occurs on 9 July with an estimated magnitude of about 7.5 on the moment magnitude scale and a maximum felt intensity of X (Extreme) on the Mercalli intensity scale. It triggers a devastating tsunami which affects the coastal towns of Byzantine Phoenicia, causing great destruction and sinking many ships. Overall large numbers of people are reported killed, with one estimate of 30,000 (including the students of the law school of Berytus from abroad) by the Anonymous pilgrim of Piacenza for Beirut alone. Justinian allocates funds to rebuild Beirut, and the law school is temporarily moved to the southern Phoenician city of Sidon, pending reconstruction; the best teachers, however, move to Constantinople.
- Representatives from Beth-Maron participate in the Constantinople synod of 553 during the reign of Justinian the Great, during which Eusebius, bishop of Tyre, was mentioned alongside Stephen, a bishop native to Batroun.

=== 560s ===
- Misfortune hits Beirut again in 560 AD as a massive fire ravages the recovering city. The law school is not reopened.
- Under Justinian's orders, eight Corinthian columns are disassembled from Baalbek and shipped to Constantinople for the restoration of Hagia Sophia around 560.
- Paul is bishop of Porphyreon under the reign of Justinian II, (565-578 AD).

=== 570s ===
- An earthquake hits Sidon, around 570 AD.

=== 580s ===
- The Byzantine army of the East is weakened by a mutiny in April 588, caused by unpopular cost-cutting measures and directed against the new commander, Priscus. Priscus was attacked and fled the army camp, and the mutineers chose the dux of Phoenice Libanensis, Germanus, as their temporary leader.

=== 590s ===
- The monks of the St. Maron Monastery send a letter to their opponents, the monks of Beit Arbaaz, around the year 592.

== Economy ==
Procopius speaks in his Secret History of the economic situation in the major cities of Lebanon at the time. In his introduction to the passage about Berytus, Procopius refers to four groups adversely affected by Justinian's policy of establishing imperial monopolies: merchants (long-distance traders), sailors, workmen, and traders in the agora (local traders). "Silken garments had for a long time been made in Berytus and Tyre, cities of Phoenicia [...] During the reign of Justinian, those who lived in Byzantium and other cities raised the price of their silks, on the plea that at the present time they were dearer in Persia, and that the import tithes were higher." According to Procopius, the Emperor "pretended to be exceedingly indignant at this, and subsequently published an edict forbidding a pound of silk to be sold for more than eight gold pieces; anyone who disobeyed the edict was to be punished by the confiscation of his property."

For Procopius, this measure appeared altogether impracticable and absurd, as it was not possible for the merchants, who had bought their wares at a much higher price, to sell it to customers at a lower rate. They accordingly resolved to give up this business, and secretly and without delay disposed of their remaining wares to certain well-known persons, who "took delight in wasting their money upon such adornments". Procopius wrote that empress Theodora heard of this from certain persons who whispered it confidentially, and, without taking the trouble to verify the report, she immediately deprived these persons of their wares, and, in addition, inflicted upon them a fine of a centenar of gold.

"At the present time, the imperial treasurer is charged with the superintendence of this trade. When Peter Barsyames held the office, they soon allowed him all manner of licence in carrying out his nefarious practices. He demanded that all the rest should carefully observe the law, and compelled those who were engaged in the silk factories to work for himself alone [...] Nearly the whole population of the cities which existed by such manufactories were reduced to begging. Artisans and mechanics were forced to struggle against hunger, and many of them, quitting their country, fled to Persia. None but the chief treasurer was allowed to have anything to do with that branch of industry, and, while he handed over part of his gains to the Emperor, he kept the greater part for himself, and thus grew wealthy at the expense of the unfortunate public."

=== Coinage ===
The majority of the coins discovered in Berytus originate from Constantinople and date back to 498-518 AD, during the reign of Anastasius I. While coins from his successors, Justin and Justinian, have also been uncovered, they are relatively scarce.

== People ==
Professors:

Dates of service (uncertain dates in italic)	Names (uncertain names in italic)
End of the 5th century, early 6th century	Sabinus
End of the 5th century, early 6th century	Anonymous, mentioned in the Scholia Sinaitica
21 November 533, 16 December 533	Dorotheus
16 December 533	Anatolius
6th century	Thaleleus
6th century	Isidorus
6th century	Stephen
? – 551	Julian

== Architecture ==
- The Church of the Resurrection, Berytus.
- The Church of Porphyreon, dedicated to the Blessed Virgin, built by Justinian I, Jieh.
- Al Qatteen convent, Sghar.
- St Fawka's monastery, Hardine.
- the Church of Saint Sergius and Bacchus (Mar Sarkis), Kaftoun.
- Saydet al-Maounah chapel, Smar Jbeil, Batroun.

== See also ==
- Byzantine Empire under the Justinian dynasty
- Phoenice Libanensis
