= Pamphilus =

Pamphilus may refer to:

- Pamphylus (mythology)
- Pamphilus of Amphipolis, painter of 4th century BC, head of Sicyonian School
- Pamphilus of Alexandria, grammarian in the 1st century
- Saint Pamphilus of Caesarea (late 3rd century - 309), scholarly creator of the library at Caesarea
- Pamphilus the Theologian, sixth-century writer
- Saint Pamphilus of Sulmona (died c. 700), bishop of Sulmona
- Pamphylos, legendary founder of Pamphylia
- Pamphilus of Sicily (Ancient Greek: Πάμφιλος Σικελός), poet of the 4th century BC mentioned by Athenaeus in the Deipnosophistae
- Pamphilus de amore, a 12th-century Latin comedy

== See also ==
- Panfilo (name)
- Small heath (butterfly), scientific name Coenonympha pamphilus
