= Pamphile (disambiguation) =

Pamphile was the legendary first weaver of silk in Greek tradition.

Pamphile may also refer to:

- Pamphile (card game), also called Mistigri, an old French card game
- Pamphile of Epidaurus, first-century historian
- Père Pamphile, fictional character in Abbé Jules by Octave Mirbeau (1888)

== See also ==
- Pamphilus (disambiguation)
- Saint-Pamphile, Quebec
