= Theological Library of Caesarea Maritima =

Library

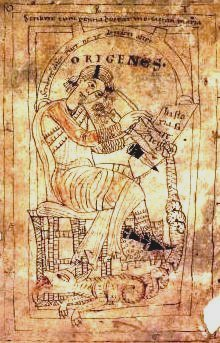
Origen, an avid collector of Christian books, helped create the Library of Caesarea.

The Theological Library of Caesarea Maritima, or simply the Library of Caesarea, was the library of the Christians of Caesarea Maritima in Syria Palaestina in antiquity.

== History ==
Through Origen and especially the scholarly presbyter Pamphilus, an avid collector of books of Scripture, the theological school of Caesarea gained a reputation for having the most extensive ecclesiastical library of the time, containing more than 30,000 manuscripts: Gregory Nazianzus, Basil the Great, Jerome and others came to study there. The Caesarean text-type is recognized by scholars as one of the earliest New Testament types.

Saint Pamphilus searched out and obtained ancient texts which he collected in the library that Jerome was later to use, and established a school for theological study. In the scriptorium, a necessary adjunct to all libraries of antiquity, he oversaw the production of edited copies of Scripture. Testimonies to this work are to be found in the colophons of biblical manuscripts. Jerome's De Viris Illustribus (75) says that Pamphilus "transcribed the greater part of the works of Origen of Alexandria with his own hand," and that "these are still preserved in the library of Cæsarea."

Among other lost treasures in the library was the Gospel according to the Hebrews. Jerome knew of this copy of the so-called "Hebrew" or Aramaic text of the Gospel of Matthew and Eusebius refers to the catalogue of the library that he appended to his life of Pamphilus. A passage from the lost life, quoted by Jerome, describes how Pamphilus supplied impoverished scholars with the necessaries of life and gave them copies of the Scriptures, of which he kept a large supply. He likewise bestowed copies on women devoted to study. The great treasure of the library at Caesarea was Origen's own copy of the "Hexapla," probably the only complete copy ever made. It was consulted by Jerome. St Pamphilus was martyred in February, 309.

The collections of the library suffered during the persecutions under the Emperor Diocletian, but were repaired subsequently by bishops of Caesarea. Acacius of Caesarea and Euzoius, successors of Eusebius, concentrated on conservation.

It was noted in the 6th century, but seems unlikely to have survived the Persian and Arab invasions in the 7th century. Its collection may have been dispersed by both the conquerors or the Byzantine elite who fled the city. Henry Barclay Swete was of the opinion that it probably did not long survive the capture of Caesarea by the Saracens in 638, and even if not destroyed at that moment, it may have perished in the changes to the town that occurred between the 7th and 12th centuries. O'Connor says of this library, "The tradition of scholarship ... was continued by Pamphilius (d. 309). By adding to the manuscript collection of Origen he created a library second only to that of Alexandria; in 630 it had 30,000 volumes." This number is based on Isidore of Seville's estimate in his Etymologiae, likely taken from an ancient or unknown source, thus must be treated with caution.

== See also ==
- Early centers of Christianity
