= Law school of Berytus =

Ancient school of Roman law, to 551 AD

Law school of Beirut
- Law school of Berytus
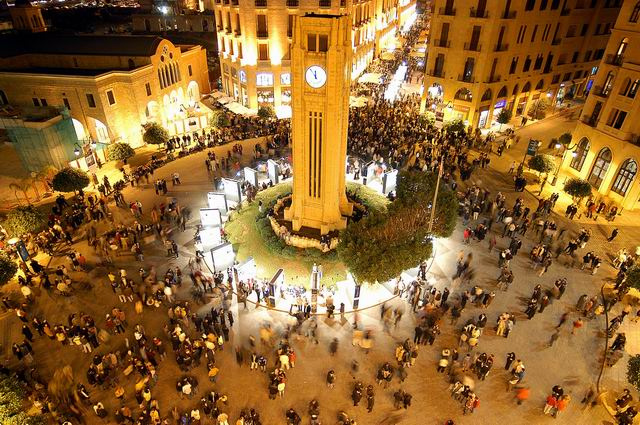
- The school's exact location is uncertain, but it is thought to have lain just north of Nejmeh Square (pictured), next to the Saint George Greek Orthodox Cathedral.

- Presumed location of the law school within Beirut Law school of Berytus (Lebanon)
- 33°53′46″N 35°30′16″E
- Type: University
- Periods: Late Antiquity
- Cultures: Roman, Byzantine
- Associated with: Justinian I, Cyrillus, Patricius, Zacharias Rhetor, St. Pamphilus, St. Triphyllius, Severus of Antioch
- Location: Beirut, Lebanon
- Part of: Colonia Julia Augusta Felix (Berytus)

History
- Abandoned: AD 551

Site notes
- Condition: Not excavated

The law school of Berytus (also known as the law school of Beirut) was a center for the study of Roman law in classical antiquity located in Berytus (modern-day Beirut, Lebanon). It flourished under the patronage of the Roman emperors and functioned as the Roman Empire's preeminent center of jurisprudence until its destruction in AD 551.

The law schools of the Roman Empire established organized repositories of imperial constitutions and institutionalized the study and practice of jurisprudence to relieve the busy imperial courts. The archiving of imperial constitutions facilitated the task of jurists in referring to legal precedents. The origins of the law school of Beirut are obscure, but probably it was under Augustus in the first century. The earliest written mention of the school dates to 238–239 AD, when its reputation had already been established. The school attracted young, affluent Roman citizens, and its professors made major contributions to the Codex of Justinian. The school achieved such wide recognition throughout the Empire that Beirut was known as the "Mother of Laws". Beirut was one of the few schools allowed to continue teaching jurisprudence when Byzantine emperor Justinian I shut down other provincial law schools.

The course of study at Beirut lasted for five years and consisted in the revision and analysis of classical legal texts and imperial constitutions, in addition to case discussions. Justinian took a personal interest in the teaching process, charging the bishop of Beirut, the governor of Phoenicia Maritima and the teachers with discipline maintenance in the school.

The school's facilities were destroyed in the aftermath of a massive earthquake that hit the Phoenician coastline. It was moved to Sidon but did not survive the Arab conquest of 635 AD. Ancient texts attest that the school was next to the ancient Anastasis church, vestiges of which lie beneath the Saint George Greek Orthodox Cathedral in Beirut's historic center.

== Background ==
As the guarantor of justice, the Roman emperor was expected to devote substantial amounts of time to judicial matters. He was the chief magistrate whose major prerogative (jus) was the ordering of all public affairs, for which he could demand assistance from anyone at any time.

With legal appeals, petitions from subjects and judicial queries of magistrates and governors, the emperors were careful to consult with the jurists (iuris consulti), who were usually secretaries drafted from the equestrian order. From the reign of Augustus (27 BC–AD 14), jurists began compiling organized repositories of imperial edicts (constitutiones), and legal scholarship became an imperially sponsored function of administration. Every new judicial decision was founded on archived legal precedents and earlier deliberations. The edict repositories and the imperially sponsored legal scholarship gave rise to the earliest law school system of the Western world, aimed specifically at training professional jurists.

== History ==
During the reign of Augustus, Beirut was established under the name Colonia Iulia Augusta Felix Berytus (Note: Named after Augustus' daughter Julia the Elder.)(and granted the status of Ius Italicum) as a colony for Battle of Actium veterans from the fifth Macedonian and the third Gallic legions. It was chosen as a regional center instead of the more prominent Phoenician cities of Tyre and Sidon, which had a history of belligerence against Rome.

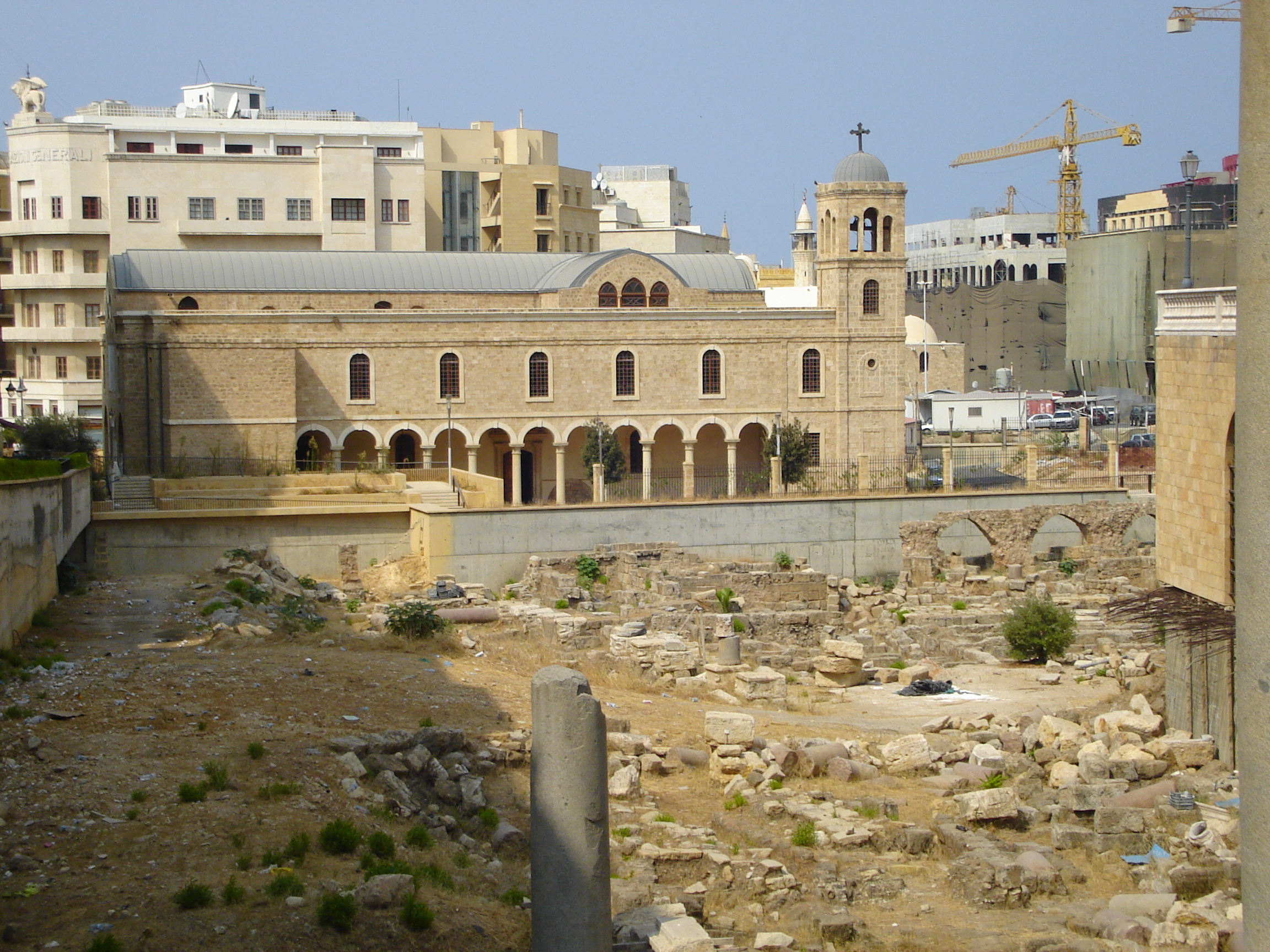
St. George's Cathedral sits on the axis of Beirut's ancient Cardo Maximus. The law school used to be located next to the Byzantine Anastasis church, a precursor of the cathedral.

Beirut was first mentioned in writing as a major center for the study of law in the 239 works of Gregory Thaumaturgus, the bishop of Neo-Caesarea. Other early written sources do not mention when the law school was established, and the date is much debated among modern historians and scholars. Edward Gibbon suggested its founding may have been directed by locally born Emperor Alexander Severus, who reigned during AD 222–235; this hypothesis had been supported by Gilles Ménage, a late 17th-century French scholar. Italian jurist Scipione Gentili, however, attributed the school's foundation to Augustus, while 19th-century German theologian Karl Hase advocated its establishment shortly after the victory at Actium (31 BC). Adolf Friedrich Rudorff dated it to the reign of Hadrian, while Franz Peter Bremer suggested that it opened around 200, based on Thaumaturgus.

Theodor Mommsen linked the establishment of the law school in Beirut with the need for jurists, since the city was chosen to serve as a repository for Roman imperial edicts concerning the eastern provinces. After arriving in Beirut, these were translated into Greek, published and archived. This function was first recorded in 196 AD, the date of the earliest constitutions contained in the Gregorian Codex, but the city is thought to have served as a repository since earlier times. The proximity of the repository to the law school allowed the Beiruti jurists to consult archived documents and for students to learn of the most recent imperial decrees—an advantage that the law schools of Caesarea Maritima and Alexandria lacked.

The 3rd-century emperors Diocletian and Maximian issued constitutions exempting the students of the law school of Beirut from compulsory service in their hometowns. In the 4th century, the Greek rhetorician Libanius reported that the school attracted young students from affluent families and deplored the school's instructional use of Latin, which was gradually abandoned in favor of Greek in the course of the century. By the 5th century, Beirut had established its leading position and repute among the Empire's law schools; its teachers were highly regarded and played a chief role in the development of legal learning in the East to the point that they were dubbed “ecumenical masters”. From 425, the law school of Constantinople became a rival center of law study and was the only school, along with Beirut's and Rome's, to be maintained after Justinian I closed those of Alexandria, Caesarea Maritima and Athens in 529 because their teachers were allegedly "unskilled" and taught doctrine that contradicted the orthodox Christian faith.

On July 9, 551, the coastal cities of Phoenicia Maritima were devastated by a high-magnitude earthquake. In Beirut the earthquake was followed by a tsunami and a fire that obliterated the city. In the aftermath, 30,000 people lost their lives, including many students from abroad. Justinian allocated funds to rebuild Beirut, and the law school was temporarily moved to the southern Phoenician city of Sidon, pending reconstruction; the best teachers, however, moved to Constantinople. Misfortune hit Beirut again in 560 AD when a massive fire ravaged the recovering city. The law school was not reopened, and all prospect for its return was abandoned with the Arab conquest in 635 AD.

== Academia ==
The study course at the law school of Beirut was restricted to Roman law; it did not cover the local laws of the province of Phoenice. Ancient texts provide an idea of the curriculum, the teaching method, the course languages and its duration.

=== Preparatory studies ===
Potential students were expected to have undergone grammar, rhetoric and encyclopedic sciences studies. Another prerequisite was the mastery of Greek and Latin, given that the classical legal references and imperial constitutions used in the teaching program were written in Latin. The aspirants could pursue their preparatory studies in public schools or have private tutors.

=== Curriculum ===
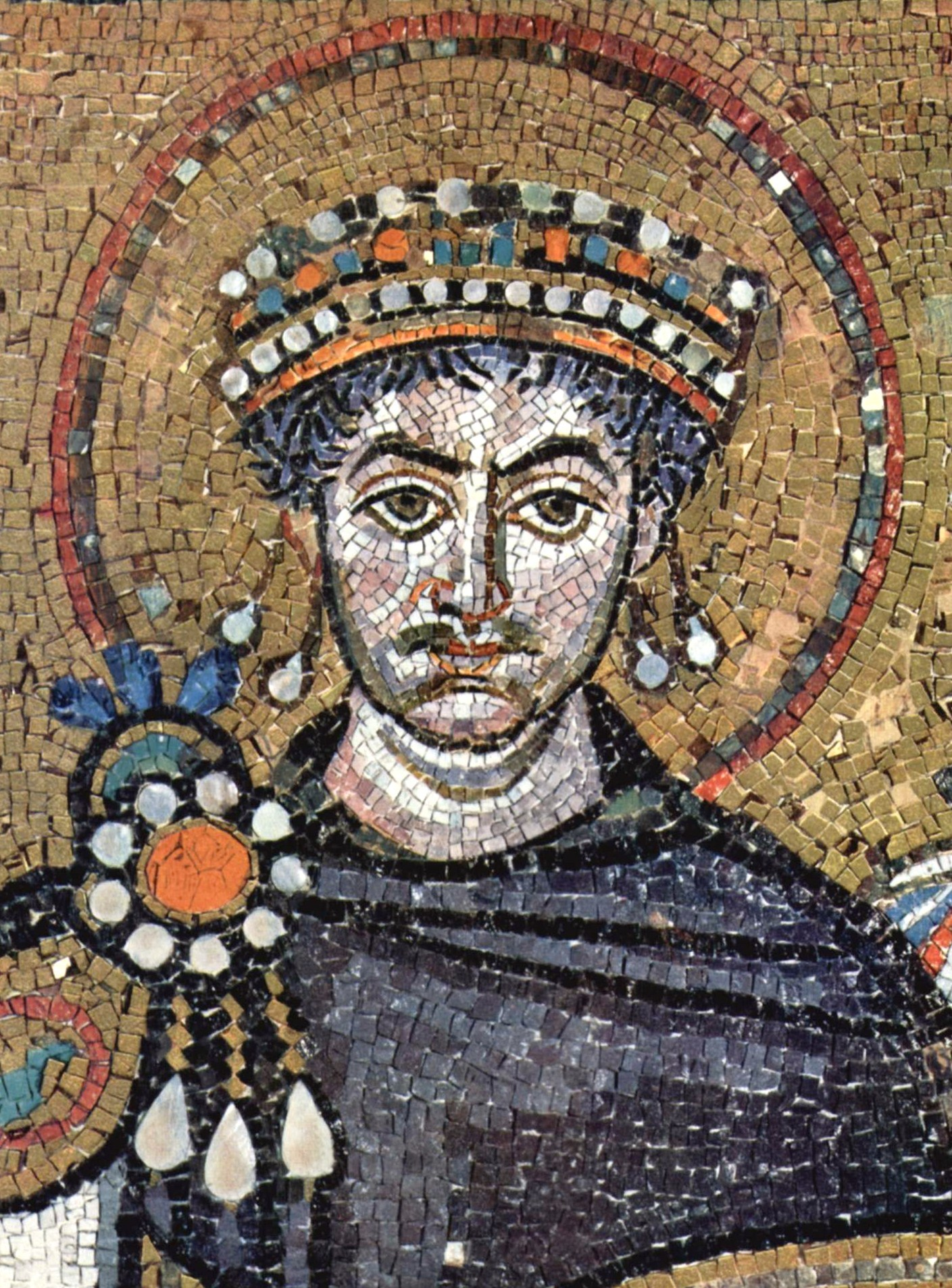
Justinian I, the emperor who instigated the rewriting of Roman law

Little is known about the Beirut law school's curriculum before the 5th century. The Scholia Sinaitica and the Scholia to the Basilika provide glimpses of the school's teaching method, comparable to the method of rhetoric schools at the time. The lecturer would discuss and analyse legal texts by adding his own comments, which included references to analogous passages from imperial constitutions or from the works of prominent classical Roman jurists such as Ulpian. He would then formulate the general legal principles and use these to resolve legal problems inspired from actual, practical cases. This method differed from the scheme of classical times in which the student had to master the law basics before engaging in case studies.

Jurisprudence was taught in Latin, even in the law schools of the East, but toward the end of the fourth and the beginning of the 5th century, Latin was supplanted by Greek at Beirut, which was the long-established lingua franca of the eastern territories of the Roman Empire. A similar shift probably occurred at the school of Constantinople at about the same time.

The Omnem constitution at the beginning of the Digest is the only source of information about the existing study system in the 5th century until the Justinian reforms of 533. The old program was a four-year course to be completed before the age of 25. The courses were based on the works of Gaius, Ulpian, Papinian and Paulus. Students attended lectures for three years and spent the fourth year in private study of Paulus' Responsa; they had the option to stay for a fifth year to study imperial constitutions. The students of each year were distinguished by special nicknames: first year, Dupondii; second, Edictales; third, Papinianistae; fourth, Lytae.

Justinian's Omnem constitution fixed the duration of the legal course in the schools of Beirut and Constantinople at five years. The courses consisted of lectures and self-study using materials advanced in his Corpus Juris Civilis, namely the Institutiones (Institutes), Digesta (Digest) and Codex (Code). First-year students were lectured on the Institutes and on the first part of the Digest; (Note: Books 1–4 of the Digest are called the Prota.) second-year students were taught the greater part of the Digest, (Note: The de iudiciis (books 5–11), the de rebus (books 12–19) and the libri singularis (books 23, 26, 28 and 30).) and third-year students had to learn various texts from Papinian and the leges singulares. (Note: Books 20–22.) There were no lectures during the course's fourth year but the pupils studied the remainder of the Digest. (Note: Books 24, 25, 27, 29 and 31–36.) Nicknames were still given according to the year of study, but Justinian changed the name of first-year students from the frivolous Dupondii (which means "two pennies") to Iustiniani novi and dubbed fifth-year students Prolytae.At the end of the course, graduands were given certificates allowing them to work as court advocates or in the imperial civil service.

=== Professorial body ===
Ancient texts reveal the names and deeds of some of the most notable law professors at the Beirut school. The scarce sources include historical accounts, works of legal scholarship, anthologies, ancient correspondences and funerary inscriptions. Antioch-based rhetoric teacher Libanius wrote many letters of correspondence to Domninus the Elder, a 4th-century law school professor. In 360, Libanius invited Domninus to leave Beirut and teach with him at the rhetoric school of Antioch. Domninus apparently declined the offer, since later correspondence to him from Libanius, between 361 and 364, served as recommendations for law school candidates. The most brilliant era of Beirut's law school, spanning the century between 400 and 500, was known as the era of the "Ecumenical Masters" (Greek: τῆς οἰκουμένης διδάσκαλοι). During this period, a succession of seven highly esteemed law masters was largely responsible for the revival of legal education in the Eastern Roman Empire. The seven revered masters, cited with praise by 6th-century scholars, were Cyrillus, Patricius, Domninus, Demosthenes, Eudoxius, Leontius and Amblichus.

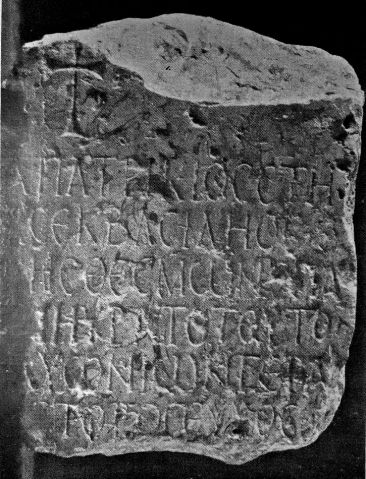
Base of a statue, possibly funerary, of Patricius, discovered in Beirut

Cyrillus was the founder of the ecumenical school of jurists. He is believed to have taught as of c. 400 or c. 410. Styled "the great" due to his reputation as a teacher, he was known for his direct use of ancient sources of law and for interpreting jurists such as Ulpian and Papinian. Cyrillus wrote a precise treatise on definitions that supplied the materials for many important scholia appended to the first and second titles of the eleventh book of the Basilika. Patricius was praised in the third preface of the Justinian Digest (Constitutio Tanta) as a distinguished professor of the Beirut law school. Archaeological excavations done in Beirut at the turn of the 20th century revealed a funerary monument believed to have belonged to Patricius. The son of Eudoxius, Leontius was described by ecclesiastical historian Zacharias Rhetor, who was his first-year student in 487 or 488, to have a great reputation in the legal field. He was raised to the office of Praetorian prefect of the East under Emperor Anastasius I between 503 and 504, and became Magister militum in 528. Leontius was also involved as a commissioner in the preparation of the first codex of Justinian. His contemporary, Amblichus, wrote a commentary on Ulpian's Libri ad Edictum.

Historical sources also tell of Euxenius, a teacher at the Beirut law school who taught during the times of the "Ecumenical Masters". Euxenius was the brother of the city's bishop Eustathius and was involved in the 460 religious controversy caused by Timothy Aelurus, which opposed the Miaphysites to the followers of the Council of Chalcedon. Dorotheus, Anatolius (son of Leontius) and Julianus were school professors contemporary to Justinian I. The first two were summoned to the imperial court and commissioned to draft the Digesta. Under the supervision of Tribonian, Dorotheus also collaborated with Theophilus, a Constantinopolitan law teacher, in drafting the Institutiones. Julianus, the last known professor of Beirut's law school, was extolled by Theaetetus as "the light of the law". After the earthquake, Julianus left Beirut and settled in Constantinople, where he authored the Epitome Iuliani in 555.

Under Justinian, there were eight teachers in the law schools of the Byzantine Empire, presumably four in each of Beirut and Constantinople's schools. Justinian mandated the supervision and enforcement of discipline in the school of Beirut to the teachers, the city's bishop and the governor of Phoenicia Maritima.

=== Notable students ===
Extant ancient texts provide a list of the names of 51 students who attended the law school of Beirut; these students came from twenty different Roman provinces. Some of those students were deemed notable and achieved fame. In his 238 AD panegyric to Christian scholar Origen of Alexandria, Cappadocian bishop Gregory Thaumaturgus relates taking extensive Latin and Roman law courses in Beirut.

According to Eusebius of Caesarea, Pamphilus of Caesarea was born into a rich family in Beirut in the latter half of the 3rd century and attended its law school. Pamphilus later became the presbyter of Caesarea Maritima and the founder of its extensive Christian library. He is celebrated as a martyr by both the Roman Catholic Church and the Eastern Orthodox Church. Eusebius also tells of martyred brothers Aphian and Aedesius, born to a noble Lycian family. They converted to Christianity while studying law in Beirut and were persecuted and executed for their beliefs.

Fourth-century historian Eunapius wrote of Anatolius, a high-ranking Roman official known to his enemies as Azutrio. Anatolius occupied the offices of consul of Syria, vicarius of the Diocese of Asia, proconsul of Constantinople, urban prefect of Constantinople in 354, and Praetorian prefect of Illyricum until his death in 360. In his account of Anatolius, Eunapius summarized: "He reached the summit of the science of law. Nothing about this is surprising because Beirut, his homeland, is the mother and nurse of these studies". Libanius' correspondence with Gaianus of Tyre discusses the latter's achievements after his graduation from the law school of Beirut; Gaianus became the consular governor of Phoenicia in 362. Gazan lawyer and church historian Sozomen, also a law student at Beirut, wrote in his Historia Ecclesiastica about Triphyllius, a convert to Christendom who became the bishop of Nicosia. Triphyllius received legal training in Beirut and was criticized by his teacher Saint Spyridon for his atticism and for using legal vocabulary instead of that of the Bible.

Zacharias Rhetor studied law at Beirut between 487 and 492, then worked as a lawyer in Constantinople until his imperial contacts won him the appointment as bishop of Mytilene. Among Rhetor's works is the biography of Severus, the last miaphysite patriarch of Antioch and one of the founders of the Syriac Orthodox Church, who had also been a law student in Beirut as of 486. Another late 5th-century student was John Rufus, an anti-Chalcedonian priest who moved to Maiuma after the expulsion of his master, Peter the Fuller. In Maiuma, John Rufus authored the Plerophoriae and the Life of Peter the Iberian.

== Location ==
Historically, Roman stationes or auditoria, where teaching was done, stood next to public libraries housed in temples. This arrangement was copied in the Roman colony at Beirut. The first mention of the school's premises dates to 350, but the description does not specify its location. In the 5th century, Zacharias Rhetor reported that the school stood next to the "Temple of God", the description of which permitted its identification with the Byzantine Anastasis cathedral.

At the turn of the 20th century, archaeological excavations in the souq between the Saint George Greek Orthodox Cathedral and Saint George Cathedral of the Maronites unearthed a funerary stele etched with an epitaph to a man named Patricius, "whose career was consecrated for the study of law". The epitaph was identified as being dedicated to the famous 5th-century law school professor. In 1994, archaeological diggings underneath the Saint George Greek Orthodox Cathedral in Beirut Central District's Nejmeh Square identified structural elements of the Anastasis cathedral, but they were restricted to an area of 316 square metres (3,400 sq ft) and failed to unearth the interred school.

== Reputation and legacy ==
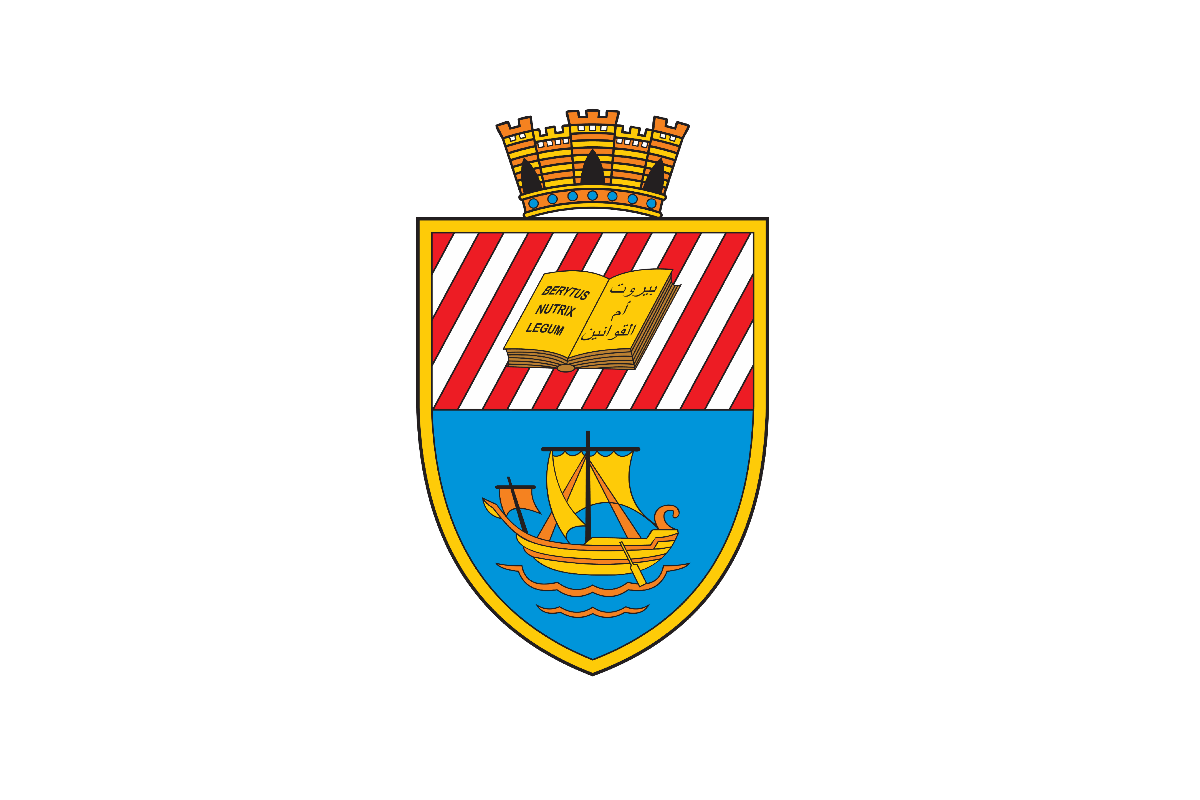
The flag of Beirut features an open book with the motto "Berytus Nutrix Legum" (Beirut, Mother of Laws) on one side and its Arabic translation "بيروت أم الشرائع " on the other.

The law school of Beirut supplied the Roman Empire, especially its eastern provinces, with lawyers and magistrates for three centuries until the school's destruction. The influx of students was abundant and persistent because of the affluence, honor and secured employment offered by the profession. A degree in law became highly sought following an edict issued in 460 by Emperor Leo I. The edict ordered that candidates for the bar of the Eastern praetorian prefecture had to produce certificates of proficiency from the law teachers who instructed them at one of the recognized law schools of the Empire.

The in-depth studies of the classical legal works in Beirut, and later in Constantinople, conferred an unprecedented scientific dimension to jurisprudence; this academic movement gave rise to the minds behind Justinian's legal reforms. As a result of the new understanding of the classical legal texts, the imperial laws of the late 5th and early 6th centuries were clearer and more coherent than those of the early Postclassical Era, according to legal historian George Mousourakis and other scholars.

The school garnered accolades throughout its existence and was bestowed with the title Berytus Nutrix Legum (Beirut, Mother of Laws) by Eunapius, Libanius, Zacharias Rhetor and finally by Emperor Justinian. His 533 Omnem constitution read:

These three works which we have composed we desire should be put in their hands in royal cities as well as in the most fair city of Berytus, which may well be styled the nursing mother of law, as indeed previous Emperors have commanded, but in no other places which did not enjoy the same privilege in old times, as we have heard that even in the brilliant city of Alexandria, and in Caesarea and others, there have been ignorant men who, instead of doing their duty, conveyed spurious lessons to their pupils, and such as these we desire to make desist from that attempt by laying down the above limits, so that, if they should hereafter be guilty of such conduct and carry on their duties outside the royal cities and the metropolis Berytus, they may be punished by a fine of ten pounds of gold and be expelled from the city in which instead of teaching the law they transgress the law.

From the 3rd century, the school tolerated Christian teachings, producing a number of students who would become influential church leaders and bishops, such as Pamphilus of Caesarea, Severus of Antioch and Aphian. Under Cyrillus, the first of the Ecumenical Masters, the Christian faith was consolidated as an integral element of the legal training.

Two professors from the law school of Beirut, Dorotheus and Anatolius, had such a repute for their wisdom and knowledge that they were especially praised by Justinian in the opening of his Tanta constitution. The emperor summoned both professors to assist his minister Tribonian in compiling the Codex of Justinian, the Empire's body of civil laws issued between 529 and 534. The Tanta passage reads:

Dorotheus, an illustrious man, of great eloquence and quæstorian rank, whom, when he was engaged in delivering the law to students in the most brilliant city of Berytus, we, moved by his great reputation and renown, summoned to our presence and made to share in the work in question; again, Anatolius, an illustrious person, a magistrate, who, like the last, was invited to this work when acting as an exponent of law at Berytus, a man who came of an ancient stock, as both his father Leontius and his grandfather Eudoxius left behind them an excellent report in respect of legal learning...

For centuries following its compilation, the work of Justinian's commission was studied and incorporated into the legal systems of different nations and has profoundly impacted the Byzantine law and the Western legal tradition. Peter Stein asserts that the texts of ancient Roman law have constituted "a kind of legal supermarket, in which lawyers of different periods have found what they needed at the time."

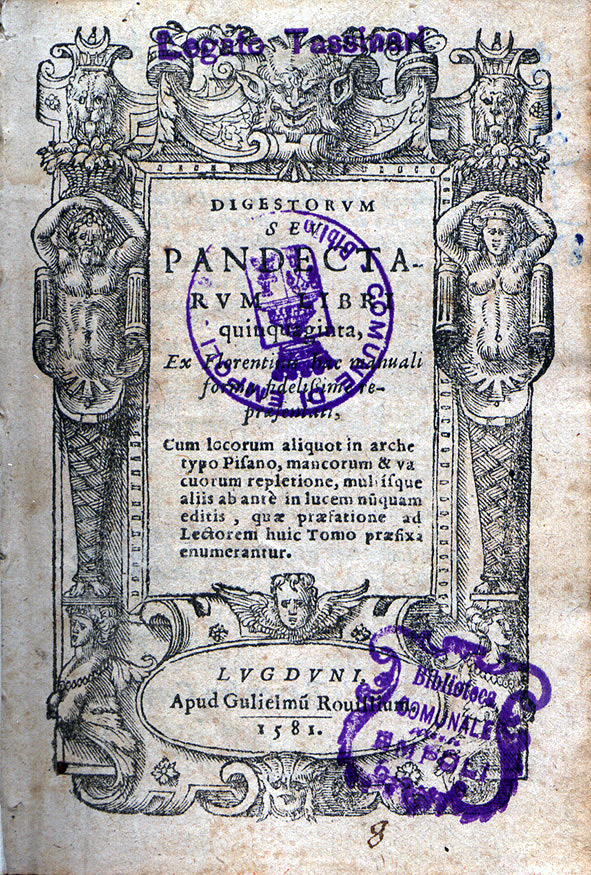
Title page of a late 16th-century edition of the Digesta, part of Emperor Justinian I's Corpus Juris Civilis

The Corpus Juris Civilis remained the basis of Byzantine law until the publication of the Ekloge ton nomon in 741 by Emperor Leo III and his son and co-regent Constantine V. The Ekloge was a shortened and more philanthropic version of the Codex of Justinian, whose dispositions were more in tune with Christian values. It was written in Greek, since Latin had fallen into disuse, and its provisions continued to be applied in later centuries in the neighboring Balkan and Asia Minor regions, with surviving translations in Slavic, Armenian and Arabic. Emperor Basil I, who ruled in the 9th century, issued the Procheiron and the Epanagoge, which were legal compilations invalidating parts of the Ekloge and restoring the Justinian laws. The Procheiron served as a basis for the Serbian code Zakonopravilo of Archbishop Sava, a compilation intended for the Serbian church that was also adopted as the basic constitution for the Bulgarian and Russian Orthodox churches. Around 900, Emperor Leo VI commissioned the Basilika, a Greek rewriting of the Justinian laws that is considered the ancestor of modern Greece's law until the enactment of the Code of 1940.

The Codex of Justinian also had a great influence on Western law, particularly on the legal history and tradition of western Europe and its American colonies. In Italy, a single complete copy of the Justinian Digest survived and lay forgotten until its rediscovery in 1070. In 1088, Irnerius, a jurist and teacher of the liberal arts in Bologna, was the first to teach the newly recovered Digest and the rest of Justinian's books. He and his successors explained the Roman laws to their students by means of glosses or explanatory notes written on the edges or between the text lines. The Roman legal concepts resulting from the studies of these "glossators" spread to the universities and law courts of Europe. The Roman law revival that started in Italy, during the Middle Ages, was taken up by France, the Netherlands and Germany in later centuries. The enactment of the German Civil Code in 1900 put an end to the application of extant forms of law derived from the Justinian codes in most European states.

The reputation of Beirut as "mother of laws" reemerged in modern times. In 1913, Paul Huvelin, the first dean of the newly established Université Saint-Joseph's Faculty of Law, dedicated the inaugural speech to the classical law school of Beirut in an effort to confer legitimacy to the new academy. The epithet Berytus Nutrix Legum is used as a motto and as part of the emblem of the Beirut Bar Association, founded in 1919. It is also featured in the seal and flag of the Municipality of Beirut.

== See also ==
- 5th century in Lebanon
- Roman temple of Bziza – Cultural heritage building in Bziza, Lebanon
- Sanctuary of Yanouh – Ancient sanctuary in Lebanon

== Bibliography ==
- Attridge, Harold W.; Hata, Gōhei (1992). Eusebius, Christianity, and Judaism. Detroit: Wayne State University Press. ISBN 9780814323618. OCLC 25315540.
- Bremer, Franz P. (1868). Die Rechtslehrer und Rechtsschulen im Römischen Kaiserreich (in German) (2012 reprint ed.). Berlin: I. Guttentag. OCLC 954880301. ISBN 9783112064498
- Buckland, William W. (1921). A text-book of Roman law from Augustus to Justinian. Cambridge: Cambridge University Press. OCLC 458951424.
- Charnock, Richard Stephen (1859). Local Etymology: A Derivative Dictionary of Geographical Names. London: Houlston and Wright.
- Chisholm, Hugh, ed. (1911). "1911 Encyclopædia Britannica/Cyrillus" . Encyclopædia Britannica. Vol. 7 (11th ed.). Cambridge University Press. p. 706.
- Clark, Gillian (2011). Late Antiquity: A Very Short Introduction. New York: Oxford University Press. ISBN 9780191611407.
- Collinet, Paul (1925). Histoire de l'école de droit de Beyrouth (in French). Paris: Société Anonyme du Recueil Sirey.
- Corcoran, Simon (July 20, 2009). "Law-school texts after 533". The Epitome of Julian. University College London. Archived from the original on November 6, 2012.
- Eunapius of Sardis (1596). Bioi philosophon kai sophiston (Lives of the Sophists) (in Greek). Hieronymum Commelinum.
- Evans, James A. S. (2005). The Emperor Justinian and the Byzantine Empire. Westport, Conn.: Greenwood Press. ISBN 9780313325823.
- Gibbon, Edward (1854). The History of the Decline and Fall of the Roman Empire – Volume 2. Boston, Mass.: Phillips, Sampson and Co.
- Goodman, Ellen (1995). The Origins of the Western Legal Tradition: From Thales to the Tudors. Annandale, NSW: Federation Press. ISBN 9781862871816.
- Greatrex, Geoffrey; Brock, Sebastian P.; Witakowski, Witold, eds. (2011). The Chronicle of Pseudo-Zachariah Rhetor: Church and War in Late Antiquity. Translated by Robert R. Phenix and Cornelia B. Horn. Liverpool: Liverpool University Press. ISBN 9781846314933.
- Hollerich, Michael (2021). Making Christian History: Eusebius of Caesarea and His Readers (1st ed.). Oakland, California: University of California Press. ISBN 9780520295360.
- Holmes, William Gordon (1912). Age of Justinian and Theodora : a history of the sixth century A.D. Vol. 2. London: G. Bell and sons. OCLC 964061376.
- Horrocks, Geoffrey (2009). Greek: A History of the Language and its Speakers (Second ed.). Chichester: John Wiley & Sons. ISBN 9781444318920.
- Jalabert, Louis (1906). "Inscriptions grecques et latines de Syrie". Mélanges de la Faculté orientale de l'Université Saint-Joseph à Beyrouth (in French). 1 (36). Beirut: 132–188. doi:10.3406/mefao.1906.891. hdl:2027/njp.32101059308591.
- Jidejian, Nina (1973). Beirut: Through the Ages. Beirut: Dar el-Machreq.
- Jolowicz, Herbert F. (1972). Historical Introduction to the Study of Roman Law. Cambridge, Cambs.: Cambridge University Press. ISBN 9780521082532.
- Jones Hall, Linda (2004). Roman Berytus: Beirut in Late Antiquity. New York: Routledge. ISBN 9780415289191.
- Justinian I, Emperor of the East (534). The Digest of Justinian. Translated by Charles H. Monro (1872 ed.). Cambridge, Cambs.: Cambridge University Press. Archived from the original (PDF) on August 17, 2013.
- Kassir, Samir (2010). Beirut. Berkeley: University of California Press. ISBN 9780520256682.
- Kunkel, Wolfgang (1973). An introduction to Roman legal and constitutional history. Oxford: Clarendon Press.
- Kuttner, Stephan (1991). Renaissance and Renewal in the Twelfth Century. Toronto: University of Toronto Press. ISBN 9780802068507.
- Lawler, Andrew (2011). "Rebuilding Beirut". Archaeology. 64 (4).
- Lokin, J. H. A. (1994). Laiou, Angeliki E.; Dieter Simon (eds.). Law and Society in Byzantium, Ninth-Twelfth Centuries. Washington D.C.: Dumbarton Oaks. ISBN 9780884022220.
- Masalha, Nur (2022). Palestine Across Millennia: A History of Literacy, Learning and Educational Revolutions. London: I.B. Tauris. ISBN 9780755642960. OCLC 1300235581.
- McNamee, Kathleen (1998). "Another chapter in the history of scholia*". The Classical Quarterly. 48 (1): 269–288. doi:10.1093/cq/48.1.269. ISSN 1471-6844.
- Merkelbach, Reinhold; Stauber, Josef (1998). Steinepigramme aus dem griechischen Osten: Die Südküste Kleinasiens, Syrien und Palaestina [Stone Epigrams from the Greek East: The Southern Coast of Asia Minor, Syria, and Palestine] (in German). Vol. Band 4. Stuttgart: B.G. Teubner. ISBN 9783598730078.
- Mommsen, Theodor (1901). "Die Heimath des Gregorianus". Zeitschrift der Savigny-Stiftung für Rechtsgeschichte: Romanistische Abteilung (in German). 22 (22). Köln: Böhlau Verlag: 139–144. doi:10.7767/zrgra.1901.22.1.139. S2CID 184391014.
- Mousourakis, George (2003). The Historical Institutional Context of Roman Law. Burlington, VT: Ashgate Publishing. ISBN 9780754621089.
- Pringsheim, Fritz (1921). 'Beryt und Bologna' in Festschrift für Otto Lenel zum fünfzigjährigen Doctorjubiläum am 16. dezember 1921: überreicht von der Rechts- und Staatswissenschaftlichen Fakultät der Universität Freiburg i. Br (in German). Ann Arbor, Mich.: University of Michigan Library.
- Rawlinson, George (1889). The History of Phoenicia. Cantebury: Longmans, Green, and Co.
- Reinink, Gerrit J.; Stolte, Bernard H., eds. (2002). The Reign of Heraclius (610–641): Crisis and Confrontation. Leuven: Peeters Publishers. ISBN 9789042912281.
- Riddle, John M. (2008). A History of the Middle Ages, 300–1500. Plymouth: Rowman & Littlefield Publishers. ISBN 9781442210042.
- Rochette, Bruno (1997). Le latin dans le monde grec: recherches sur la diffusion de la langue et des lettres latines dans les provinces hellénophones de l'Empire romain (in French). Vol. 233. Brussels: Latomus revue des études latines. ISBN 9782870311738.
- Rudorff, Adolf A. F. (1857). Römische rechtsgeschichte (in German). Leipzig: B. Tauchnitz.
- Sadowski, Piotr (2010). "Szkoła prawa w Bejrucie w świetle listów i mów Libaniusza" [Beirut law school in the light of letters and sayings of Libanius] (PDF). Studia Prawnoustrojowe (in Polish). 12: 203–218. Archived from the original (PDF) on 2019-08-27 – via Czasopisma humanistyczne.
- Sartre, Maurice (2005). The Middle East Under Rome. Cambridge, Mass.: Harvard University Press. ISBN 9780674016835.
- Schulz, Fritz (1967). History of Roman Legal Science. Oxford: Clarendon press.
- Sedlar, Jean (2011). East Central Europe in the Middle Ages, 1000–1500. Seattle: University of Washington Press. ISBN 9780295800646.
- Sheppard, Steve (1999). The History of Legal Education in the United States: Commentaries and Primary Sources. Pasadena, CA: The Lawbook Exchange. ISBN 9781584776901.
- Skaf, Isabelle; Makaroun Bou Assaf, Yasmine (November 29 – December 3, 2005). Aïcha Ben Abed; Ben Khader; Martha Demas; Thomas Roby (eds.). Une nouvelle approche pour la préservation in situ des mosaïques et vestiges archéologiques au Liban: La crypte de l'église Saint-Georges à Beyrouth. Lessons Learned: Reflecting on the Theory and Practice of Mosaic Conservation (9th ICCM Conference, Hammamet, Tunisia) (in French). Getty Publications. ISBN 9780892369201.
- Stein, Peter (1999). Roman Law in European History. Cambridge, Cambs.: Cambridge University Press. ISBN 9780521643795.
- Sterk, Andrea (2009). Renouncing the World Yet Leading the Church: The Monk-Bishop in Late Antiquity. Cambridge, Mass.: Harvard University Press. ISBN 9780674044012.
- Thaumaturgus, Gregory (1873) [239]. "Oratio Panegyrica ad Originem" [The Oration and Panegyric Addressed to Origen] (PDF). In Philip Schaff (ed.). Ante-Nicene Fathers. Vol. 6. Translated by S. D. F. Salmond. Edinburgh: Christian Classics Etheral Library.
- Walker, Jeffrey (2000). Rhetoric and Poetics in Antiquity. New York: Oxford University Press. ISBN 9780195351460.
