= Panfilo (name) =

Pánfilo de Narváez (1478–1528) was a Spanish conquistador and soldier.

The name Panfilo is the Italian and Spanish form of the Latin name Pamphilus. Other notable people named Panfilo include:

- Pamphilus of Sulmona (7th century – 8th century), an Italian bishop and saint
- Panfilo Castaldi (c. 1398 – c. 1490), an Italian physician and printer
- Panfilo Gentile (1889–1971), an Italian journalist, writer and politician
- Panfilo Nuvolone (1581–1651), an Italian painter
- Pánfilo Natera García, a Mexican general and politician who served as Governor of Zacatecas
- Panfilo Lacson (born 1948), a Filipino police officer and politician
- Pánfilo Escobar (born 1974), a Paraguayan footballer
- Panfilo, one of the ten protagonists of the frame story in Giovanni Boccaccio's The Decameron (14th century)
