= Triphyllius =

Fourth century saint

Saint Tryphillius
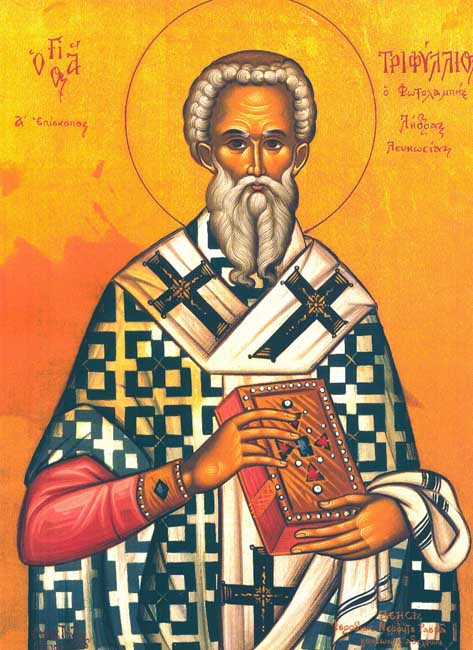
- Icon of Saint Tryphillius

Saint
- Born: unknown Constantinople, (present-day Istanbul)
- Died: 370; Leucosia, Cyprus
- Venerated in: Roman Catholic Church; Eastern Orthodox Church
- Feast: 13 June (Western calendar)

Saint Triphyllius (Greek: Τριφύλλιος, romanized: Tryphyllios; also spelled Tryphillius, Triphylius) was born in Constantinople in the early fourth century. He was educated in law at the school of Beirut. He converted to Christianity and was named bishop of Nicosia. Triphyllius was a follower of Saint Spyridon of Trimythous. He was also an ardent supporter of Saint Athanasius of Alexandria against the Arians, and he was consequently persecuted by them. Saint Jerome considered him one of the most eloquent Church figures of the era.
