= Protothronos =

Protothronos (Greek: πρωτόθρονος, "first-throned") is a Greek term used in the Eastern Orthodox Church to denote precedence among bishops (or rather their sees). Thus it can denote the first-ranked metropolitan bishop within a patriarchate, or the first among the suffragan bishops of a metropolitan see. Such bishoprics were in turn often raised to separate archbishoprics or metropolises.

== See also ==
- Primate (bishop), Catholic counterpart

== Sources ==
- Kazhdan, Alexander, ed. (1991). The Oxford Dictionary of Byzantium. New York and Oxford: Oxford University Press. ISBN 978-0-19-504652-6.
