= Cyrillus =

Cyrillus, Greek jurist of the 5th century, was a professor in the ancient Law School of Berytus (present-day Beirut), and one of the founders of the oecumenical school of jurists (τῆς οἰκουμένης διδάσκαλοι). This school preceded the succession of Anastasius to the Eastern empire (AD 491), and paved the way for Justinian's legislation.

His reputation as a teacher of law was great; and from the fragments of his works which have been preserved it may be inferred that his merit as a teacher consisted in his direct use of ancient sources of law, and in interpreting the best writers, such as the commentary of Ulpian on the edict and the Responsa Papiniani.

He wrote a treatise on definitions (υπομνημα των δεφινιτων), in which, according to a statement of his contemporary Patricius, the subject of contracts was treated with great precision, and which supplied the materials for many important scholia appended to the first and second titles of the eleventh book of the Basilica. He is generally styled "the great" to distinguish him from a more modern jurist of the same name, who lived after the reign of Justinian, and who compiled an epitome of the Digest.
