= Amphian =

Christian martyr and saint (c. 287 – c. 305)

Saint Amphian
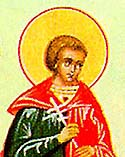
- Martyr
- Born: c. 287
- Died: c. 305
- Venerated in: Roman Catholic Church; Eastern Orthodox Church
- Feast: April 2

Amphian (Latin: Amphianus, Greek: Αμφιανός) is venerated as a martyr by the Catholic Church and by the Eastern Orthodox Church. He is said to have died during the persecutions of the Emperor Galerius on April 2 in or around the year 305. In the Eastern Orthodox calendar, his feast thus falls on April 2, along with his brother Aedisius.

== Origins ==
He was from Lycia, and his wealthy and distinguished parents gave him the best education possible in rhetoric, law, and philosophy in the famous school of Berytus in Phoenicia. While he was away at school, he became a Christian. Amphian and Aedisius withdrew to Cappadocia because their parents resisted their efforts to convert them to Christianity.

== Martyrdom ==
Pamphilus was at Caesarea Maritima at the time of Amphian's martyrdom, expounding Holy Scripture, and the young Amphian was one of his disciples. He lived at the house of Eusebius, but gave no intimation of his purpose to make the public protest which ended in his martyrdom.

According to his legend, he was only eighteen when he entered the temple at Caesarea Maritima, where the prefect Urbanus was offering sacrifice. Seizing the prefect’s hand as he was about to present the incense, he reproached the magistrate for his idolatrous act. The guards fell upon him furiously and, after cruelly torturing him, flung him into a dungeon. The next day, he was brought before the prefect, torn with iron claws, beaten with clubs, and burned over a slow fire, and then sent back to confinement. Two days later, he was taken from prison and thrown into the sea with a stone tied around his neck. Eusebius, an eyewitness, declares that an earthquake simultaneously shook the city, and that the sea flung up his corpse on the shore.

His brother was sent to live in Alexandria; after denouncing the governor there, he was also tortured and drowned.

== Feast ==
In the old martyrologies his feast was on April 5, but the Bollandists give April 2 as the correct date.

== See also ==
- 4th century in Lebanon
