= Dorotheus (jurist) =

Dorotheus (Greek: Δωρόθεος) was a professor of Roman law in the law school of Berytus in Phoenicia. While his date of birth is unknown, he must at least have died before 542. He was one of the three commissioners appointed by the Eastern Roman emperor Justinian I to draw up a book of Institutes, after the model of the Institutes of Gaius, which should serve as an introduction to the Digest (or Pandects) already completed and promulgated on 16 December 533. His colleagues in this project were Tribonian and Theophilus; and their work was accomplished in 533 and they were all granted with the highest title quaestor sacri palatii illustris. Except for the first code of 7 April 529, Dorotheus participated in the compiling of all Justinian's codes (Institutes, Digest and Codex repetitae praelectionis), including the second edition of the Codex Constitutionum (promulgated in 534).

As a method of teaching, the ancient law professors (so-called antecessores) used to write commentaries (sometimes mere translations) on all parts of Justinian's law. While Justinian's law was promulgated in Latin, these commentaries were written in Greek, because lawyers (students and practitioners) were hardly able to read Latin anymore. Fragments of this commentary, which was in the Greek language, have been preserved in the Scholia appended to the body of law compiled by order of the emperor Basilius the Macedonian and his son Leo the Wise, in the 9th century, known as the Basilica.

From this, it seems probable that the commentary of Dorotheus contained the substance of a course of lectures on the Digest delivered by him in the law school of Berytus. This course of lectures followed a strict order, which was prescribed by Justinian in his constitutio Omnem. According to this schedule the Institutes, a part of the Digest (Books 1 - 22) and all of the code were taught successively and most of the lecture would consist of dictation. In this dictation pattern comes firstly the Index of the statute at stake, secondly the original text in Latin and thirdly the veritable lecture on conceptual, literal and substantial problems of the respective provision.
