= Leontius, Hypatius and Theodulus =

Roman soldiers and martyrs

Saints Leontius, Hypatius and Theodolus

Martyrs
- Died: ~70-79 AD; Tripoli
- Venerated in: Eastern Orthodox Church, Oriental Orthodoxy, Catholic Church
- Canonized: Pre-congregation
- Feast: 18 June
- Patronage: Syria

Saints Leontius, Hypatius and Theodolus (Greek: Λεόντιος, Ὑπάτιος & Θεόδουλος) were Roman soldiers who, according to Christian tradition, were martyred for their faith.

Leontius was Greek by origin, and served as an officer of the imperial army in the Phoenician city of Tripoli during the reign of Vespasian (70–79). Leontius was distinguished for his bravery and good sense, and the people of Tripoli held him in deep respect because of his virtue.

The emperor appointed the Roman senator Adrian as governor of the Phoenician district, with full powers to hunt out Christians, and in case of their refusal to offer sacrifice to the Roman gods, to give them over to torture and death. On his way to Phoenicia, Adrian received a report that Leontius had turned many away from worshipping the pagan gods. The governor sent the tribune Hypatius with a detachment of soldiers to Tripoli so as to find and arrest the Christian Leontius. Along the way the tribune Hypatius fell seriously ill, and being near death, he saw in a dream an angel, which said: "If you wish to be healed, you and your soldiers should say three times: 'God of Leontius, help me.'".

Opening his eyes Hypatius beheld the angel and said, "I was sent to arrest Leontius, how is it that I should appeal to his God?" At this moment the angel became invisible. Hypatius told his dream to the soldiers, among whom was his friend Theodolus, and all of them together asked for help from the God whom Leontius confessed. Hypatius was immediately healed, to the great joy of his soldiers, but only Theodolus sat aside, pondering the miracle. His soul was filled with love for God, and he told Hypatius to proceed twice as quickly to the city in search of St Leontius.

Upon their arrival in the city, a stranger met them and invited them to his house, where he lavishly hosted the travelers. Learning that their hospitable host was St Leontius, they fell on their knees and asked him to enlighten them with faith in the True God. They were baptized there, and when Leontius prayed over them calling on the Name of the Most Holy Trinity, a luminous cloud overshadowed the newly baptized and poured forth rain. The remaining soldiers in search of their commander arrived in Tripoli, where the governor Adrian had also arrived. Learning what had happened, he ordered Leontius, Hypatius and Theodolus to be brought to him. After threatening them with torture and death, he demanded that they renounce Christ and offer sacrifice to the Roman gods.

All three firmly confessed their faith in Christ. Hypatius was put under a column and raked with iron claws, and Theodolus was mercilessly beaten with rods. Seeing the steadfastness of these saints, they beheaded them. After torture, they sent Leontius to prison. In the morning he came before the governor. Adrian tried to entice him with honors and rewards, but accomplishing nothing, he gave him over to new tortures. Leontius was suspended head downwards from a pillar with a heavy stone about his neck, but nothing could make him renounce Christ. The governor gave orders to beat the sufferer with rods until he died. They then threw Leontius' body outside the city, but Christians reverently buried it near Tripoli.

The deaths of these martyrs occurred between 70 and 79. The accusation against St. Leontius and his sufferings and death are recorded on tin tablets prepared by the court scribe (commentarisius). These tablets were placed at the grave.

== Veneration ==
A cathedral at Bosra was dedicated to Leontius and he was the patron saint of Syria.
