= Pamphilus the Theologian =

6th century Palestinian Christian theologian

Pamphilus the Theologian (Greek: Πάμφιλος ὁ Θεολόγος) was probably a late sixth century Palestinian compiler writing in the aftermath of the Council of Chalcedon and the fall-out this produced in the eastern Christian provinces. His work is in the form of questions and answers illustrating the points at issue at the Council and subsequently, i. e. in the form of chapters dealing with points such as: hypostasis, ousia, physis, and other points at debate between neo-Chalcedonians and Monophysites. The philosophical implication of such terms for Christology is thoroughly developed.

The work includes a number of quotations from standard authors such as the Cappadocians, John Chrysostom and Cyril of Alexandria, and also Pseudo-Dionysius, but also from a number of authors condemned at various councils (e.g. Apollinarius, Eunomius, Eutyches, Nestorius, Paul of Samosata, Valentinian).

Pamphilus is to be distinguished from the earlier Pamphilus of Caesarea, martyr and mentor of the encyclopaedic Christian apologist, Eusebius of Caesarea

== Works ==
- Diversorum Postchalcedonensium Auctorum Collectanea I: Pamphili Theologi Opus, ed. José H. Declerck (Corpus Christianorum Series Graeca 19) Leuven University Press, Brepols, 1989.
