= Aedesius of Alexandria =

Christian saint and martyr; brother of St. Aphian

Saint Aedesius of Alexandria

Martyr
- Born: unknown Patara, Lycia (modern-day Gelemiş, Kaş, Antalya, Turkey)
- Died: 9 April 306; Alexandria, Egypt
- Venerated in: Roman Catholic Church; Eastern Orthodox Church
- Feast: 9 April (Western calendar); 2 April (Eastern calendar)
- Attributes: Drowned with his brother Amphian

Saint Aedesius of Alexandria (Greek: Αιδέσιος; died 306) was an early Christian martyred under Galerius Maximianus. He was the brother of Saint Amphian. According to the martyrology, he publicly rebuked a judge who had been forcing Christian virgins to work in brothels in order to break them of their faith, so he was tortured and drowned.

== Life and martyrdom ==
=== Western tradition ===
At Alexandria, in the time of Emperor Maximian Galerius, the martyr St. Aedesius, brother of the blessed Apphian. Because he publicly reproved the wicked judge who delivered to coruptors virgins consecrated to God, he was arrested by the soldiers, exposed to the most severe torments, and thrown into the sea for the sake of Christ our Lord.

— The Roman Martyrology

The historian Eusebius of Caesarea elaborates Aedesius' story: like his brother, he was a philosopher that converted to Christianity. Perhaps because of his standing among the educated, he seems to have thought little of professing his faith before magistrates, for which he was imprisoned several times and was sentenced to work in the mines of Palestine. He sought solitude in Egypt after his release, but found the persecution there was harsher under Hierocles. Aedesius was offended by the enslavement of consecrated virgins (who were forced to work in brothels), and so presented himself before the governor, whereupon he was seized by soldiers, tortured, and drowned. The saint's acta are preserved in a Chaldaic text. This story is probably confused, and perhaps conflated with that of the contemporary Neoplatonist philosopher, Aedesius.

=== Eastern tradition ===
The account of the Eastern Church says Aedesius and his brother were born in Patara of high-standing pagan parents. The brothers converted while studying in Beirut, secretly fleeing to Caesarea to be taught by Pamphilus of Caesarea. It is reported that Amphianus gave himself up to martyrdom, having "a twenty-year-old body but the understanding and greatness of soul of a centenarian." Having tried to stop the pagan governor of the area from sacrificing to idols, he was tortured; his legs were wrapped in cotton and burned, and they threw him into the sea with a stone around his neck. Aedesius was punished by being sent to a copper mine in Palestine, and then to Egypt. In Alexandria, he spoke out against Hierocles, who had been forcing Christian "nuns, virgins and pious women" to work alongside prostitutes in brothels. The account says Aedesius struck the prince, for which he was tortured and drowned in the sea like his brother.

== Veneration ==
Aedesius' feast day is celebrated on 8 April in the Roman Catholic Church. In Eastern Orthodox Churches, his feast is 2 April.

In art, Aedesius is shown shipwrecked with his brother; the mention of a depiction that has his legs wrapped in oiled linen before he is burned to death is probably a reflection of the Eastern story of his brother's martyrdom.
