= 551 Beirut earthquake =

Earthquake off the Lebanese coast

- Location within Lebanon
- Local date: 9 July 551
- Magnitude: 7.5 M_{w}
- Epicenter: 33.9°N 35.5°E
- Areas affected: Phoenice Libanensis, Byzantine Empire (now Lebanon)
- Max. intensity: MMI X (Extreme)
- Tsunami: Yes
- Casualties: Above 30,000

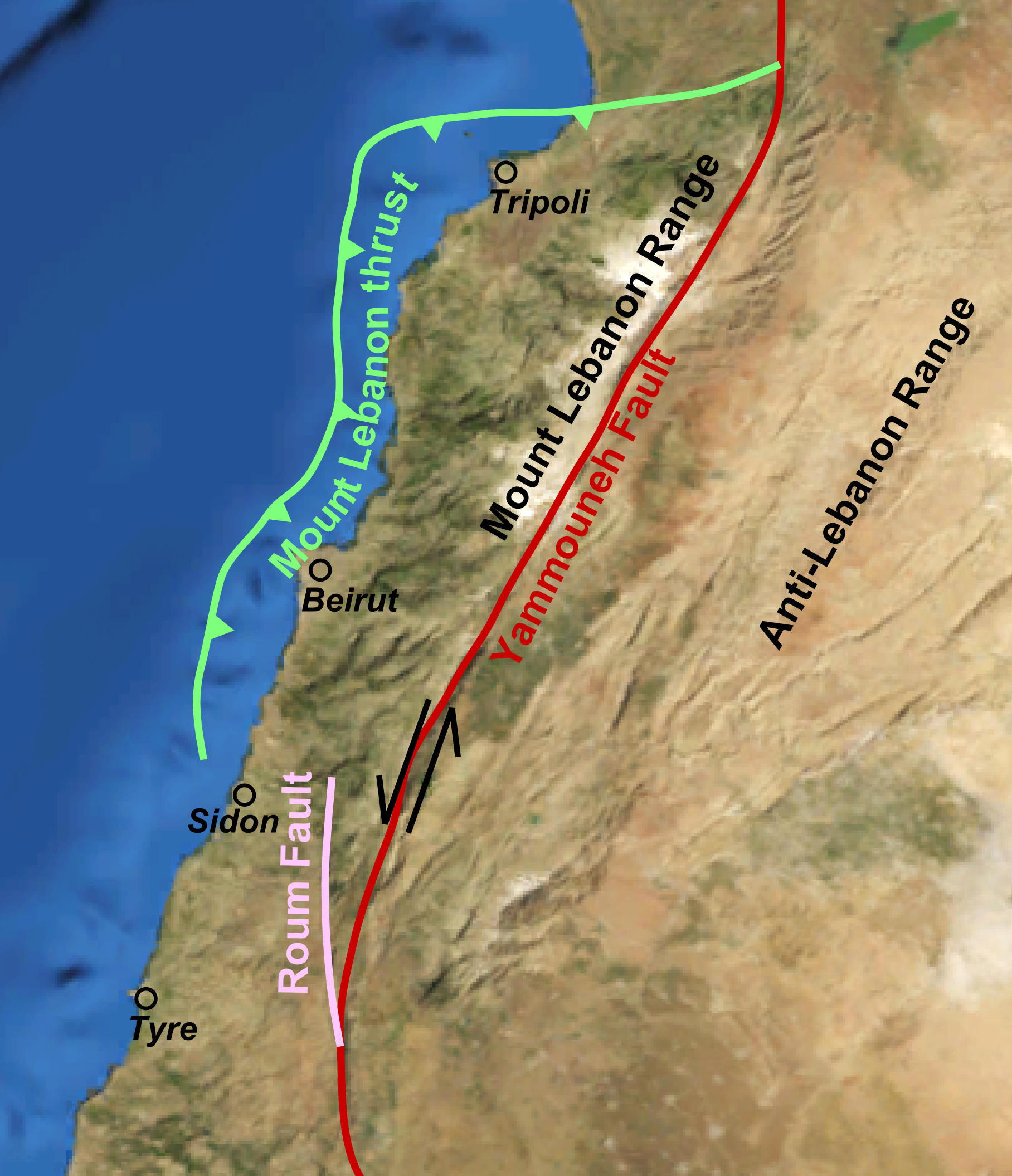
Main tectonic features of Lebanon

An earthquake occurred in Byzantine Phoenicia on 9 July 551 with an estimated magnitude of about 7.5 on the moment magnitude scale and a maximum felt intensity of X (Extreme) on the Mercalli intensity scale. It triggered a devastating tsunami which affected the province's coastal towns, causing great destruction and sinking many ships. Overall, large numbers of people were reported killed, with one estimate of 30,000 by the anonymous pilgrim of Piacenza for Berytus (modern Beirut) alone.

== Tectonic setting ==
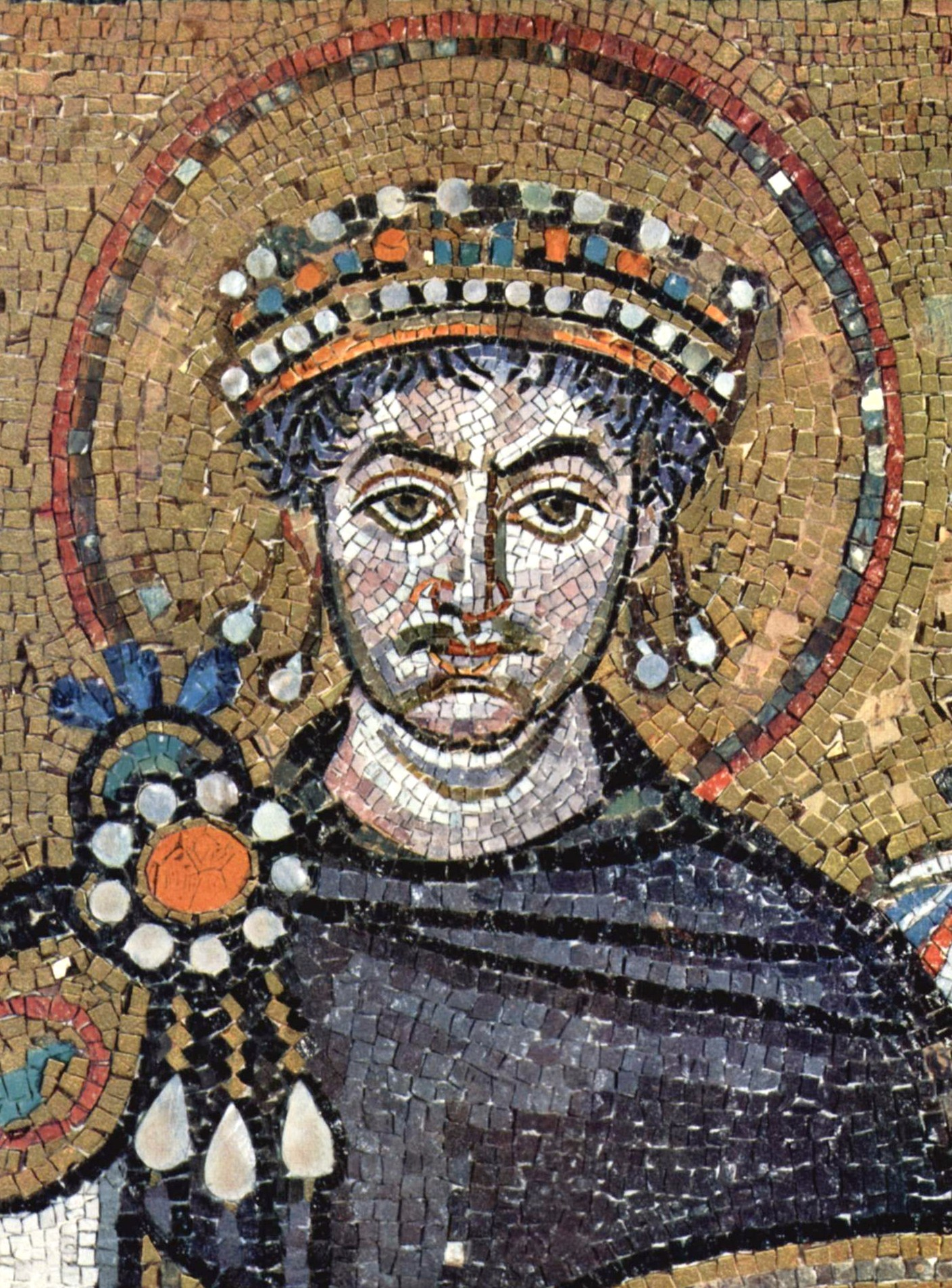
The earthquake occurred during the reign of Justinian I (pictured) as Eastern Roman emperor.

What is now Lebanon lies astride the Dead Sea Transform, which forms part of the boundary between the Arabian plate and the African plate. In Lebanon the fault zone forms a restraining bend associated with a right stepping offset of the fault trace. Transpressional deformation associated with this bend has formed a number of thrust faults, such as the recently identified Mount Lebanon thrust, which underlies the city and is interpreted to crop out at the seabed offshore.

== Damage ==
There is little in the way of detailed descriptions of the damage caused by this earthquake in contemporary accounts. Sources refer to the coastal cities from Tyre to Tripoli being reduced to ruins with many thousands of casualties. The anonymous pilgrim of Piacenza reported that 30,000 people died in Beirut alone. Reports of damage at Petra and other locations in the Jordan Valley associated with the 551 event have been re-analyzed, suggesting that a later earthquake was more likely to be responsible.

=== Accounts ===
==== John Malalas' description ====
The earliest account of the earthquake comes from John Malalas, who recorded in his Chronographia that in the year 551 AD, during the 14th indiction, a catastrophic earthquake struck the regions of Palestine, Arabia, Mesopotamia, Antioch, Phoenice Maritima, and Phoenice Libanensis, with Tyre, Sidon, Beirut, Tripolis, Byblos, and Botrys being most affected, alongside parts of other settlements, where many people were trapped. In Botrys, part of the mountain known as Lithoprosopon, located near the sea, broke off and fell into the water, creating a harbor large enough to accommodate very large ships. This was significant, as the city had never previously had a harbor.

In response to the disaster, the emperor provided financial assistance to all the affected provinces and undertook restoration efforts for parts of the damaged cities. During the earthquake, the sea receded by a 1,600 m (1 mi), destroying numerous ships, but eventually returned to its original position.

==== Agathias' description ====
Agathias, a Greek poet and historian, also recounted the effects of the earthquake in his Histories:

"[...] several cities both on the islands and the mainland were razed to the ground and their inhabitants wiped out. The lovely city of Berytus, the jewel of Phoenicia, was completely ruined, and its world-famous architectural treasures were reduced to a heap of rubble, practically nothing but the bare pavements of the buildings being left. Many of the local inhabitants were crushed to death under the weight of the wreckage, as were many cultivated young men of distinguished parentage who had come there to study the Law [...] At this point, then, the professors of law moved to the neighboring city of Sidon, and the schools were transferred there until Berytus was rebuilt. The restored city was very different from what it had been in the past, though it was not changed beyond recognition, since it still preserved a few traces of its former self [...]"

== Characteristics ==
=== Earthquake ===
The earthquake was felt over a wide area from Alexandria in the southwest to Antioch in the north previously damaged by the earthquake of 526. The area which felt an intensity of VIII or more extends from Tripoli in the north to Tyre in the south. Estimates for the magnitude vary from 7.2 on the surface-wave magnitude scale to a possible 7.5 on the moment magnitude scale. The rupture length is estimated to be greater than 100 kilometres (62 mi) and possibly as long as 150 kilometres (93 mi). The origin of the tsunami was thought to have been due to an underwater landslide triggered by an earthquake on the Dead Sea Transform itself. More recent analysis suggested that an offshore continuation of the Roum Fault mapped onshore may have been responsible. However, seabed surveys have discounted this possibility and the discovery of geologically recent fault scarps on the seabed indicate that movement on the newly identified Mount Lebanon Thrust was the cause of the earthquake and the resulting tsunami. Quaternary uplift recorded by a series of marine-cut terraces between Tripoli and Beirut are consistent with continuing upward movement of the hanging wall of the proposed thrust. At a smaller scale, an uplifted vermetid bench, which indicates vertical movement of about 80 cm, is dated to the sixth century A.D. Continued uplift above this thrust since the late Miocene may explain the formation of the Mount Lebanon range.

=== Tsunami ===
The tsunami affected the whole of the coast from Tyre to Tripoli. Withdrawal of the sea by up to 3 km (2 mi) was recorded in some contemporary accounts.

== Future seismic hazard ==
The estimated return time for large earthquakes on the Mount Lebanon thrust is 1500–1750 years, although a shorter return time is also possible depending on the dating of the most recent sea-level highstand. This latter possibility would indicate that a repeat of this event may be long overdue.

== See also ==
- List of historical earthquakes
- List of tsunamis
- 6th century in Lebanon
