= Pamphilus of Caesarea =

Presbyter of Caesarea Maritima, Syria Palaestina

Saint Pamphilus of Caesarea
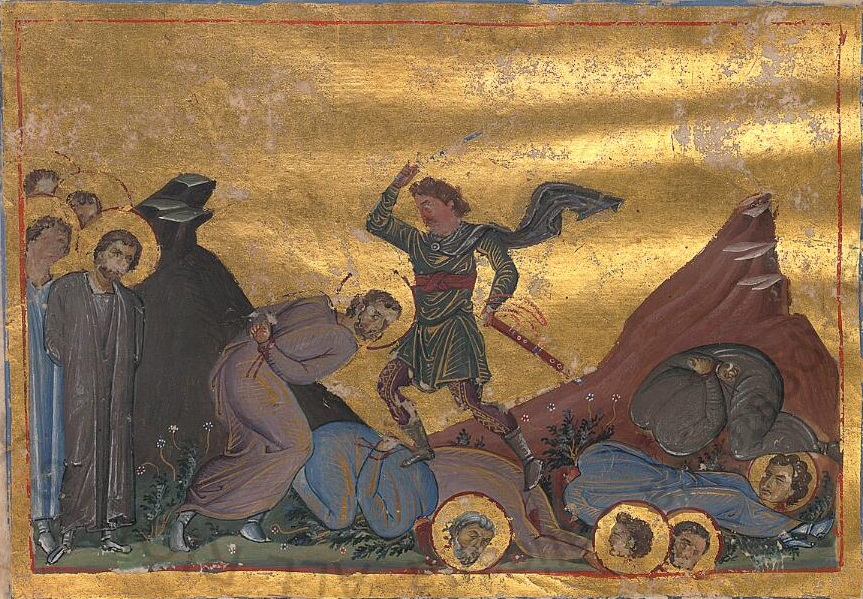
- From the Menologion of Basil II

Hieromartyr
- Born: c. latter half of the 3rd century Berytus, Syria Phoenice
- Died: February 16, 309; Caesarea, Syria Palaestina
- Venerated in: Eastern Orthodox Church; Catholic Church
- Canonized: Pre-Congregation
- Feast: February 16; also (RC only) June 1

Pamphilus (Greek: Πάμφιλος; latter half of the 3rd century – February 16, 309 AD), was a priest of Caesarea and chief among the biblical scholars of his generation. He was the friend and teacher of Eusebius of Caesarea, who recorded details of his career in a three-book Vita that has been lost.

== Biography ==
A native of Phoenicia, Eusebius' Martyrs of Palestine attests that Pamphilus was of a rich and honorable family of Beirut. This work also asserts that he gave all his property to the poor and attached himself to the "perfect men". Photius quotes Pamphilus's Apology for Origen to the effect that Pamphilus went to Alexandria, where his teacher was Pierius, the head of the famous catechetical school there, before settling in Caesarea Maritima, where he was ordained a priest. In Alexandria, Egypt, Pamphilus became devoted to the works of Origen of Alexandria. Photius says that Pamphilus was born at Berytus, and a scholar of Pierius, who collected sacred literature. According to Eusebius, he suffered martyrdom in the third year of the Diocletianic persecution, after spending two years in prison. While he was in prison, Pamphilus and Eusebius worked together on five books in defense of Origen.

The Diocletianic persecution began in earnest in the year 303. In 306 a young man named Apphianus—a disciple of Pamphilus "while no one was aware; he even concealed it from us who were even in the same house"—interrupted the governor in the act of offering sacrifice, and paid for his boldness with martyrdom. His brother Aedesius, also a disciple of Pamphilus, suffered martyrdom about the same time at Alexandria under similar circumstances. Pamphilus's turn came in November, 307. He was brought before Urbanus, the governor of Palestine, and upon refusing to offer sacrifice, was cruelly tortured, and then relegated to prison. In prison he continued copying and correcting manuscripts. He also composed, in collaboration with Eusebius, also imprisoned, an Apology for Origen in five books, which Eusebius edited and to which he added a sixth book. Pamphilus and other members of his household, along with Valens, deacon of the Church of Jerusalem and Paul of Jamnia, men "in the full vigour of mind and body", were without further torture sentenced to be beheaded in February, 309. While sentence was being given a youth named Porphyrius - "the slave of Pamphilus", "the beloved disciple of Pamphilus", who "had been instructed in literature and writing" – demanded the bodies of the confessors for burial. He was cruelly tortured and put to death, the news of his martyrdom being brought to Pamphilus before his own execution. Nearly at the same time another of his companions, Patriklos, suffered a martyr death in Caesarea and was later interred after the payment of a ransom to Diocletian in Cappadocia.

== Veneration ==
Pamphilus is regarded as a saint by the Roman Catholic Church and the Eastern Orthodox Church. His feast day is celebrated on 16 February (the RC Church lists an additional commemoration on 1 June).

== Works and influence ==
- Of the Apology for Origen only the first book is extant, in a Latin version made by Rufinus. It begins with describing the extravagant bitterness of the feeling against Origen. He was a man of deep humility, of great authority in the Church of his day, and honoured with the priesthood. He was above all things anxious to keep to the rule of faith that had come down from the Apostles. The soundness of his doctrine concerning the Trinity and the Incarnation is then vindicated by copious extracts from his writings. Then nine charges against his teaching are confronted with passages from his works. Jerome stated in his De Viris illustribus that there were two apologies—one by Pamphilus and another by Eusebius. He discovered his mistake when Rufinus's translation appeared in the height of the controversy over Origen, and rushed to the conclusion that Eusebius was the sole author. He charged Rufinus, among other things, with palming off under the name of the martyr what was really the work of the heterodox Eusebius, and with suppressing unorthodox passages. As to the first accusation there is abundant evidence that the Apology was the joint work of Pamphilus and Eusebius. Against the second may be set the negative testimony of Photius who had read the original; "Photius, who was severe to excess towards the slightest semblance of Arianism, remarked no such taint in the Apology of Origen which he had read in Greek." The canons of the alleged Council of the Apostles at Antioch were ascribed by their compiler (late fourth century) to Pamphilus.
- The ascription to Pamphilus, by Gennadius, of a treatise Contra mathematicos was a blunder due to a misunderstanding of Rufinus's preface to the "Apology".
- A Summary of the Acts of the Apostles among the writings associated with Euthalius bears in its inscription the name of Pamphilus.
- While defending Origen from accusations that he held and taught certain heterodox doctrines, Pamphilus endorses universal reconciliation as the orthodox understanding of apokatastasis. Late 19th-century universalist historians Hosea Ballou II and J. W. Hanson have cited Pamphilius, among other Fathers of the Church, as an example of early Christian universalism, although the exact conception of apokatastasis in patristic writings generally, and Origenian thought in particular, is disputed among historical theologians.
- David Hume adopted the evocative pseudonym Pamphilus for his Dialogues Concerning Natural Religion.

== See also ==
- Pamphilus the Theologian
- Theological Library of Caesarea Maritima
- 4th century in Lebanon

== Sources ==
- Lives of the Saints, For Every Day of the Year, edited by Rev. Hugo Hoever, S.O.Cist., Ph.D., New York: Catholic Book Publishing Co., 1955, pp. 211–212.
