= Patricius (jurist) =

Fifth-century Roman jurist

Patricius (Greek: Πατρίκιος) was a fifth-century Roman jurist who taught in the ancient Law School of Berytus (present-day Beirut). Patricius was of the seven revered "Ecumenical Masters" (Greek: τῆς οἰκουμένης διδάσκαλοι) and occupied the position of Quaestor of the Sacred Palace in the East, a senior legal office in the late Roman Empire, from the middle to the late fifth century.

== Ancient inscription ==
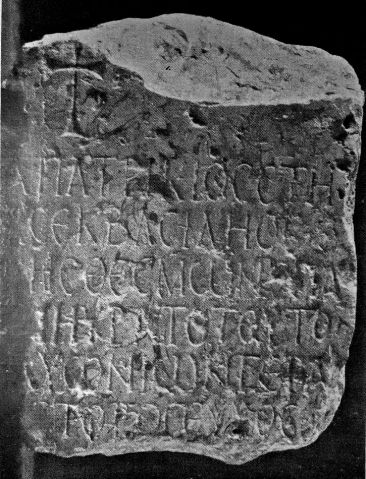
Limestime statue base with ancient Greek inscription mentioning Patricius. The base was unearthed in 1906 in Beirut. Has disappeared since 1925.

At the turn of the 20th-century, a well polished 35 centimetres (14 in) by 45 centimetres (18 in) limestone bloc was unearthed during excavations near the Saint George Greek Orthodox Cathedral in Beirut. The bloc dates back to the Byzantine period and may have served as a statue base or a commemorative stele. The bloc bears a fragmentary Greek inscription that was published by Father L. Jalabert in 1906. According to Collinet, the bloc text could be an epitaph honoring "Patrikios" the jurist of Berytus.

The Greek inscription reads:

... α Πατριχιος στη ...
... ας ἐχ βασιληος ...
... ρης θεσμῶν ἑπα ...
... μ' ηυρατο τοϋτον ...
... Αὐσονιων σεβα[στό ...]
... στορος εῦχος ...

Collinet explains that the expression θεσμῶν Αὐσονιων translates into the "Laws of Ausonia", Ausonia being the ancient Greek name for lower Italy (extended poetically to all Italy) and reveal that the Patricus mentioned in the inscription was well versed in Roman Law. Collinet believes that the word εύχος (ancient Greek for glory) is a further indicator of the elevated social standing of the person in question.
