= Scholia Sinaitica =

Roman legal document

The Scholia Sinaitica are fragments of a work of Roman law written in Greek, dating between 438 and 529 AD, containing comments to the books 35-38 of Ulpian's ad Sabinum treatise.

The papyrus fragments that show parts of the work were discovered by the Greek scholar Gregorios Bernardakis in the 19th century in a Mount Sinai convent.

The scroll is not the work of a single author, but of different authors at different times who are generally thought to be of Eastern origin. The literature suggests that the authors were connected to the Law School of Berytus, they cite numerous works of Roman jurists, texts from imperial constitutions and also the Codex Gregorianus, the Codex Hermogenianus and the Codex Theodosianus, demonstrating knowledge and availability of legal texts of Roman law broader than that demonstrated by contemporary authors of the western part of the empire.

== Sources ==
- Salvatore Riccobono, Scholia Sinaitica, 1898
