= Mseilha Fort =

Fortress in Batroun district, Lebanon

- قلعة المسيلحة (Arabic)
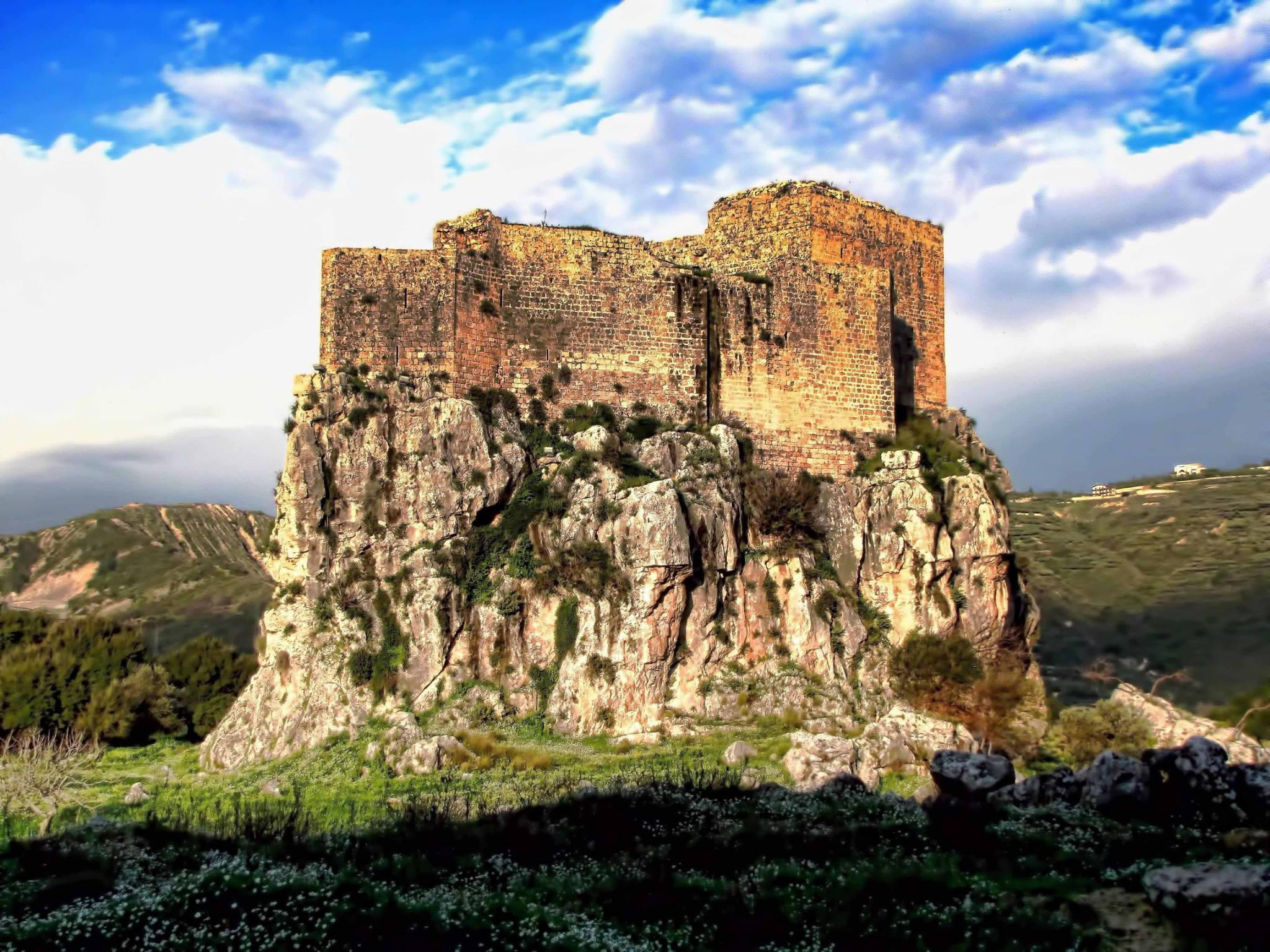
- The Mseilha Fort with the Ras ash-Shaq'a promontory in the background

- Location within Lebanon
- 34.2738°N 35.6898°E
- Location: Hamat, Caza of Batroun, Lebanon

History
- Built: c. 1624
- Built for: Fakhr al-Din II

Site notes
- Governing body: Directorate General of Antiquities

The Mseilha Fort (Arabic: قلعة المسيلحة, romanized: Qalʿat al-Msaylḥa) is a historic fortification located in Northern Lebanon, strategically positioned on the right bank of Nahr al-Jaouz river, in Hamat, approximately 2.5 kilometers northeast of the city of Batroun in North Lebanon. The fort's location enabled it to oversee key passages through the valley and control the ancient pathways circumventing the coastal Ras ash-Shaq'a promontory, a significant geological formation along the Lebanese coast that historically posed challenges to travelers.

The name Mseilha originates from the Arabic term for "fortified place", a diminutive of musallaha (Arabic: مسلحة), meaning "fortified." Constructed on a limestone rock formation, the current structure dates back to the 17th century, likely commissioned by Emir Fakhr al-Din II. It lacks Crusader-era architectural elements, though historical records suggest the site may have been fortified during the Crusades. The existing fort, a product of traditional sandstone masonry, consists of two main sections, fortified walls up to two meters thick, a triangular courtyard, and defensive arrowslits, with adaptive design suited to the surrounding terrain.

The Mseilha Fort is conflated in some sources with the Puy du Connétable, a medieval Crusader estate and fortification that defended the nearby Ras ash-Shaq'a promontory. However, architectural and historical evidence suggests that these were distinct structures, with Mseilha constructed in the Ottoman period, likely on or near the site of the earlier Crusader fortifications. The Mseilha Fort was featured on the 1964 25 Lebanese Lira banknote.

== Location ==
The Mseilha Fort stands on the right bank of Al-Jaouz river, to the south-east of Ras ash-Shaq'a promontory; a massive geological formation that cuts through the coast of Lebanon, making it historically difficult for travelers to circumvent. The fort is located within the municipal area of Hamat, 2.5 km (1.6 mi) northeast of Batroun, and is strategically located to control the crossing of the Al-Jaouz river and the pathways that climb the valley slopes or bypass the promontory.

== Names and etymology ==
The name of the Mseilha Fort has been recorded in various forms over time, often influenced by the accounts of western travelers. The French archaeologist René Dussaud noted that Antoine-Alphonse Montfort, a French painter, was the first traveler to record the correct name of the fort, spelling it as Mseïla. The 17th-century English traveler and clergyman Henry Maundrell referred to it as Temseida, likely a corruption due to his limited familiarity with the Arabic language. Other travelers frequently misinterpreted or misspelled the name; the Swedish travel and orientalist Jakob Berggren referred to the fort as Qal’at Mezaibeha, following Johann Ludwig Burckhardt, a Swiss traveler, who wrote Kalaat Meszabeha, likely due to a misreading of his travel notes. Similarly, the German explorer Ulrich Jasper Seetzen's manuscript was, according to Dussaud, misread by his editors, resulting in Kalat Inszelha. The first documented use of the name Mseilha is attributed to Dussaud in his 1897 publication, Voyage en Syrie. Later, Swiss historian Max von Berchem, writing in 1914, used the form El-Musailiha, further contributing to the variations in the fort's recorded name. Mseilha, derives from the Arabic word for "fortified place," being a diminutive form of musallaha (Arabic: مسلحة), meaning "fortified". Other modern alternative romanizations include Qal'at al Mouseiliha, Musayliha, and Museiliha.

== History ==
=== Strategic importance and early defenses ===
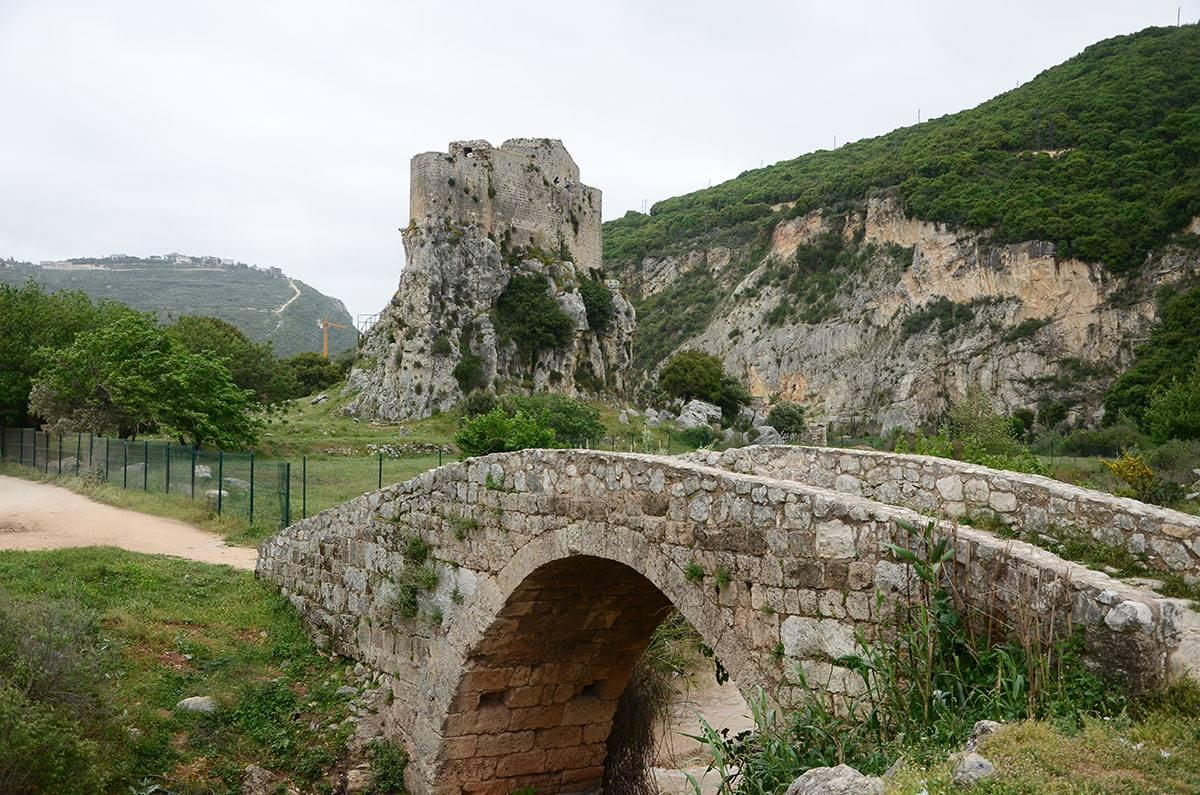
Mseilha Fort and medieval bridge

Following the collapse of the Ras ash-Shaq'a promontory in the aftermath of the 551 CE earthquake, the coastal road linking the cities of Batroun, El-Heri and Tripoli was lost, transforming the northern shoreline into a high sea cliff. Consequently, a new road bypassing the promontory from the east was necessary to ensure communication between the coastal cities. Crossing the Nahr el-Jaouz valley, this road turns around Ras ash-Shaq'a promontory to reach the other side at a spot near El-Heri called Bab el-Hawa (meaning the "door of the wind").

During the Crusades, the prominent land mass of Ras ash-Shaq'a held significant strategic value in the defense of the County of Tripoli. It guarded one of the region's most perilous road segments and overlooked the Bay of Heri, a coastal area well-suited for maritime landings. Due to its strategic importance, Ras ash-Shaq'a was designated as a separate lordship, distinct from the nearby fiefs of Nephin (modern Anfe) to the north and Boutron (modern Batroun) to the south. This territory was granted as a fief to the Constable of Tripoli, and there was likely a direct connection between holding the fortification of the fief and the office of constable. Twelfth century historian of the First Crusade, Albert of Aix described the strategic position of the defensive fortification that then existed atop the Ras ash-Shaq'a promontory to guard a narrow pass:

This mountain, detached from the more distant mountain chain, extends over a vast area of land all the way to the sea. A tower that dominates and controls the route through one of its gates rises at the summit of this mountain. This small structure can hold no more than six men, but these few would be enough to defend the pass against all who live under the sky.

During the two centuries of Frankish occupation that followed, the Crusader Counts of Tripoli fortified Ras ash-Shaq'a, referring to the estate as "Puy du Connétable" (Hill of the Constable), "Puy Guillaume, and the mountain pass as "Passe Saint-Guillaume", all of which, according to historian Maxime Goepp likely also refer to the Mseilha Fort. In a 1109 document, Bertrand, Count of Saint-Gilles, gifted the Church of St. Lawrence of Genoa full control over the Castle of the Constabulary (Latin: Castrum Constabularii) Gibellum (modern Jbeil), and one-third of Tripoli's territory. (Note: The agreement read: 1109, June 26, indiction II. — Bertrand, Count of Saint-Gilles, in the presence of Baldwin I, King of Jerusalem, grants to the Church of St. Lawrence of Genoa, through the hands of William Embriaco, Oberto Ussumaris, Ingo Pedegola, Ansald Caput de Burgo, the entirety of Gibellum with its appurtenances, the Castle of the Constabulary, and also a third part of Tripoli from one sea up to another, as defined by the king's standard. Furthermore, it is promised to protect the islands of the city itself and the port, as well as their commerce and freedoms.) This lordship would be maintained until 1278, with the lords of Le Puy appearing as constables of the County up to that date. Around 1276, the vicinity of the Puy du Connétable was the site of a battle during the war between Guy II Embriaco of Gibelet and the Knights Templar against Bohemond VII, Count of Tripoli.

=== Connection to the Puy du Connétable ===
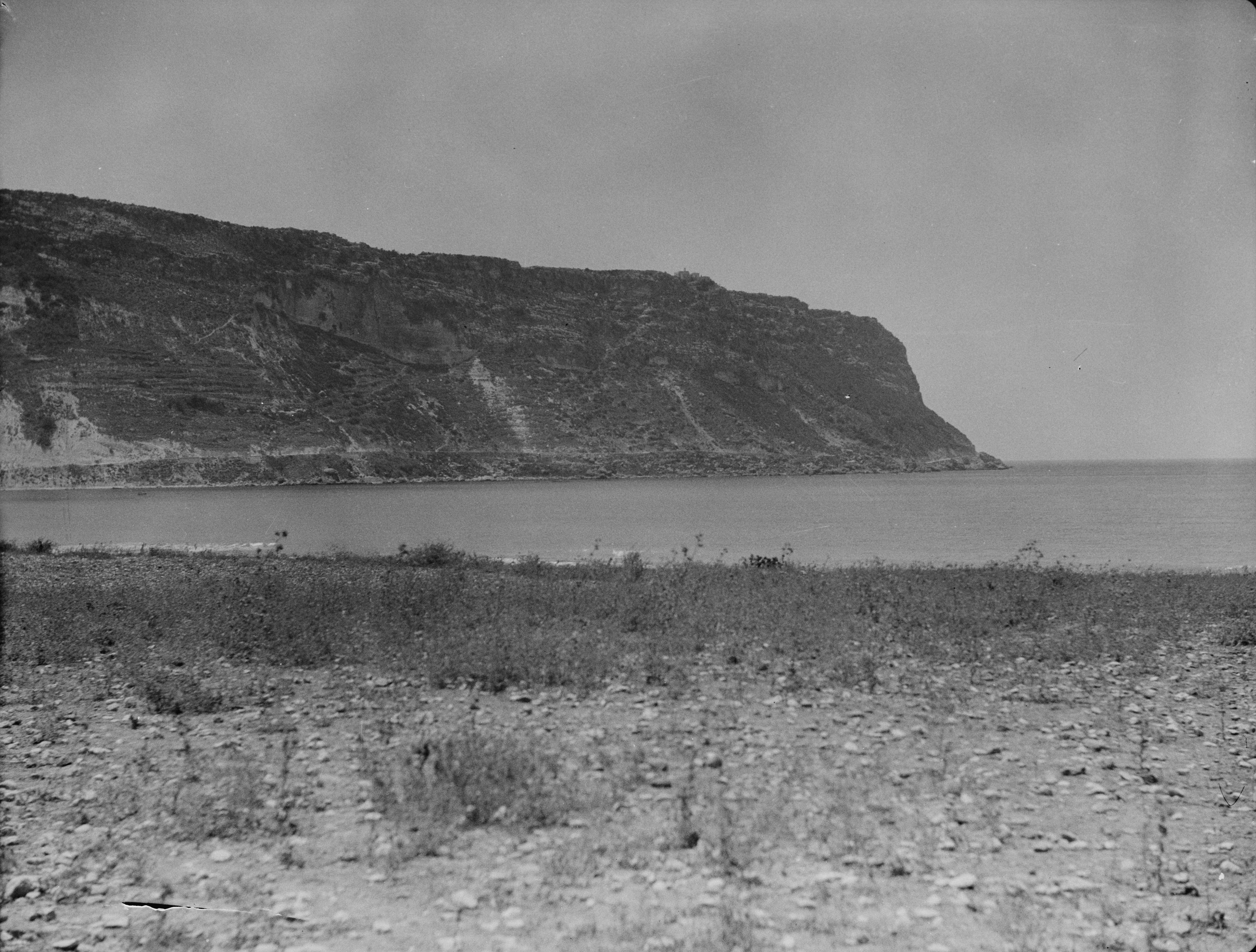
The Ras ash-Shaq'a promontory viewed from al-Heri (1920)

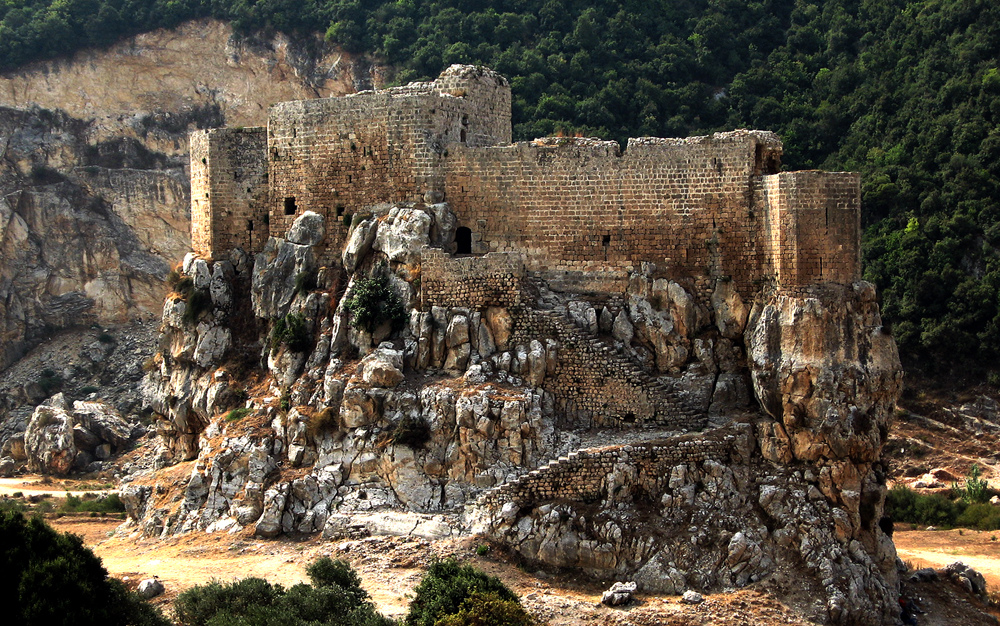
A lateral view of the Mseilha fort, Lebanon

The Mseilha Fort is conflated in some sources with the Puy du Connétable, but the exact location and extent of the latter remains uncertain with historians like Emmanuel-Guillaume Rey, and Henri Lammens, suggesting that the Puy likely referred to the estate located north of the promontory in al-Heri, (Note: Misinterpreted as "Obreh" in Rey) or to a previous structure at the location of the Mseilha Fort respectively. Scholars noted that while the rock on which the fort stands may have served as a military position in ancient times, the current fort structure does not include any elements from the Crusader era. The construction techniques, cutting methods, stone block sizes, and low arched doors and windows, among other elements, suggest that the current structure was built in the 17th century at the earliest. The nineteenth-century French historian Ernest Renan could not relate the architectural elements in Mseilha to anything earlier than the Middle Ages. Paul Deschamps, a 20th-century historian of Crusader architecture, confirmed the lack of any Crusader-era features in the current fort but did not rule out the possibility that it replaced earlier Crusader constructions, as surviving Frankish literature indicates the Crusaders had fortified the strategic pass between Ras ash-Shaq'a and the foothills of Mount Lebanon. Deschamps further posits, that the tower described by Albert of Aix during the march of the First Crusade in 1099 may have been located on the Mseilha rock, a theory echoed by French historians René Grousset and Jean Richard.

Modern scholars Davie and Salamé-Sarkis distinguish the Mseilha Fort from the historical Puy du Connétable. According to them, the entire promontory of Ras ash-Shaq'a was known from 1109 to 1282 in Crusader-era texts as Puy du Connétable. The estate was defended by the Castrum Constabularii, as mentioned in Bertrand of Saint-Gilles' 1109 document, which likely replaced an earlier tower described by Albert of Aix. According to scholars Davie and Salamé-Sarkis, this tower may have been situated at the summit of Jabal an-Nuriyya, a strategic position on the northern tip of the Ras al Shaq'a promontory, that enabled monitoring of both the mountain pass and the bay of Heri.

=== Construction and historical mentions ===
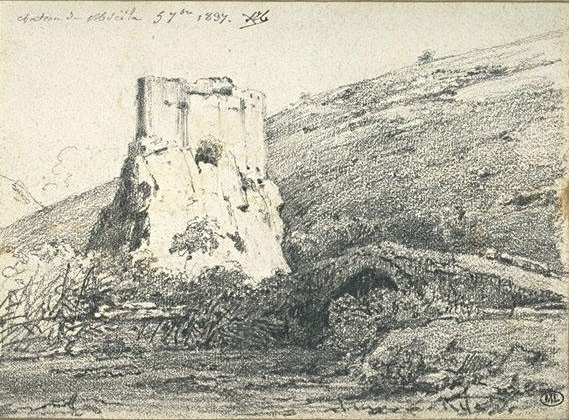
1837 Sketch of the Mseilha fort by Antoine-Alphonse Montfort (1802-1884)

French traveler Jean de La Roque passed near the Mseilha Fort in late 1689 on his route from Tripoli to Batroun. He recorded a local account attributing the fort's construction to Emir Fakhr al-Din II, the Druze former ruler of Lebanon. Nineteenth century Lebanese scholar Father Mansur Tannus al-Hattuni, recounting events of 1624, noted that Emir Fakhr al-Din II "ordered Sheikh Abu Nadir al-Khazin to construct the Mseilha Fort north of Batroun". (Note: Abi Nadir al-Khazin was a muqaddam (tax collector), and key supporter and adjutant of Emir Fakhr al-Din II Ma'n. He held significant influence under Fakhr al-Din's rule, being tasked multiple times (in 1616, 1617, 1618, and 1621) with collecting taxes in the regions of Kisrawan, Jbeil, Batroun, and Jebbet Bsharri. In 1617, he was granted the tax farm of Kisrawan as an inheritable holding.) Hattuni's source, Tannus al-Shidyaq, mentions that the fort was built by Fakhr al-Din II and added in his account of 1631—six years after the fort's construction—that Abu Nadir al-Khazin conducted restoration work on the fort. The year 1624 is accepted as the date of the fort's construction. Burckhardt, (Note: See above in the 'Names and etymology' section) who visited the area in the early 19th century and confirmed that Mseilha Fort was of relatively recent origin. Maundrell, writing in 1697, described it as a small fort perched upon a steep, perpendicular rock, with walls conforming to the rock's natural shape, commanding the passage into a narrow valley.

=== Modern era ===
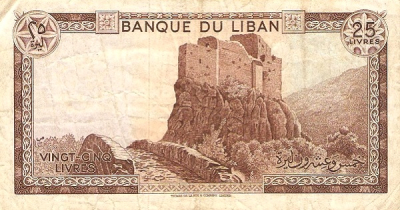
Reverse of the 1964 25 Lira banknote featuring the Mseilha Fort

Antoine-Alphonse Montfort took part in an expedition between 1837 and 1838 to visit Syria, Lebanon and Palestine, and kept a detailed travel diary, which is now part of the collection of the Bibliothèque nationale de France. He sketched landscapes, historical sites, and fortifications, among which the Mseilha Fort. (Note: Nous avions marché environ une demi-heure dans la vallée, lorsque nous arrivâmes à un petit pont jeté sur le torrent desséché formant le fond du vallon : en face de nous sur un roc isolé, très escarpé et placé au centre du vallon, s’élevait un château que Burckhardt dit être un ouvrage des Motoualis. Les Arabes nomment ce château Mseïla. [We had been walking for about half an hour in the valley when we arrived at a small bridge over the dried-up torrent forming the bottom of the valley: in front of us, on an isolated, very steep rock placed in the center of the valley, stood a castle that Burckhardt says is a work of the Motoualis. The Arabs call this castle Mseïla]) Max Van Berchem and the Swiss architect Edmond Fatio, conducted the first comprehensive archaeological study of the site and documented their observations in their 1914 publication, Voyage en Syrie. The Mseilha Fort was featured on the reverse of the 25 Lebanese Lira banknote issued between 1964 and 1983. In 2007, restoration works were undertaken to make the site safe for visitors. Funded by USAID, these works are a continuation of a project conducted by SRI International-INMA to rehabilitate the fort, in cooperation with the Lebanese Ministry of Tourism and the Ministry of Culture - Directorate General of Antiquities.

In 2022, a restoration project at Mseilha, funded by a US grant of $210,000, was launched. Its completion was celebrated four years later, on 16 October 2026, in a ceremony attended by Culture Minister Ghassan Salamé and US Ambassador Michel Issa. The project included the restoration of the fortress's mill, the revival of traditional production practices, and support for agriculturalist from the area in promotion of sustainable practices.

== Architecture and description ==
External 3D model
- 3D model of Mseilha Fort , linked from Sketchfab.

The Mseilha fort is 15 m (49 ft) high, built on a narrow limestone rocky outcrop. Its walls range from 1.5 to 2 m (4.9 to 6.6 ft) in thickness, and were built with medium-sized sandstone blocks, although some larger limestone blocks are also present, likely repurposed from older structures. The fort was built in two phases, resulting in two adjoining sections that form a single architectural unit. It is approached through a narrow, steep path on the northern side of the rock, which incorporates steps carved directly into the bedrock. This path leads to a small masonry terrace and a low, rounded-arch doorway. The entrance opens into a narrow, triangular courtyard bordered by a two-bay vaulted building on the southern side, possibly used for storage, with as a cistern in its lower level. The curtain wall on the southern side rises approximately two meters higher than the northern wall, likely an intentional design to counterbalance the elevated mountain terrain to the south, which offers a natural strategic advantage controlling the entrance of the Nahr el-Jaouz valley. In the west tower, an archery chamber offers a vantage point with narrow arrow slits. The eastern section of the fort is more elevated and fortified, with a cluster of vaulted rooms surrounding a small inner courtyard. From this courtyard, a staircase leads to an upper level, where each room is similarly equipped with arrow slits for defense. At the easternmost tip, a square tower juts forward.

Van Berchem's sketches of the Mseilha Fort (1914)

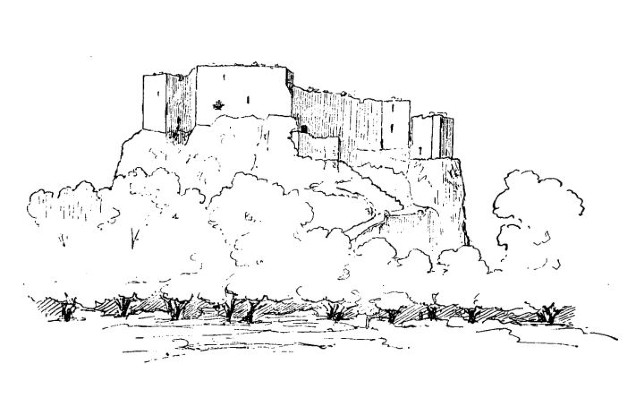
The fort as seen from the North

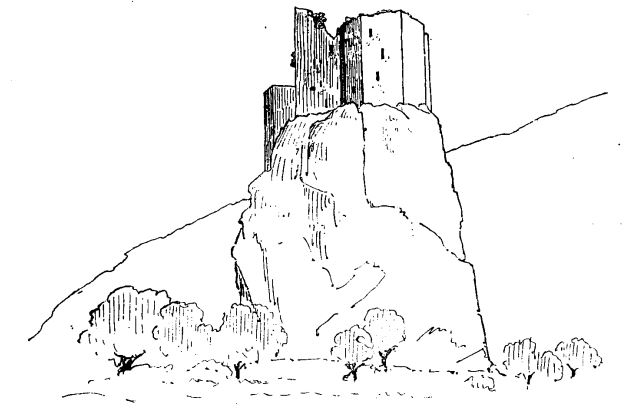
East view of the fort

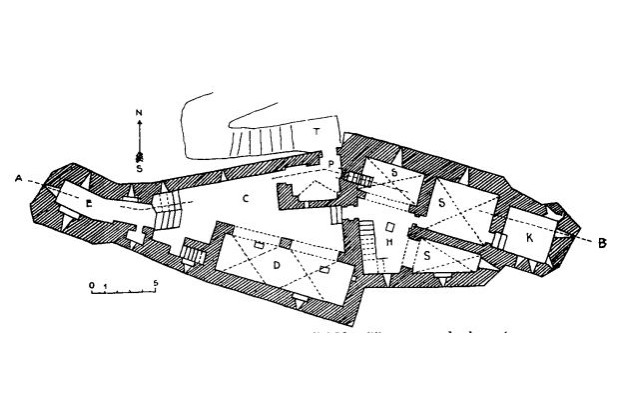
Ground floor plan

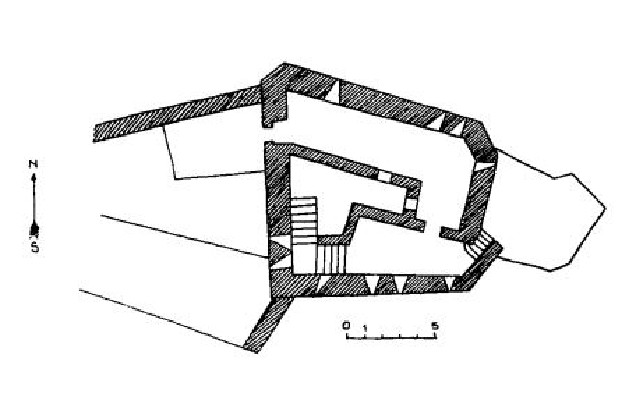
Partial upper floor plan

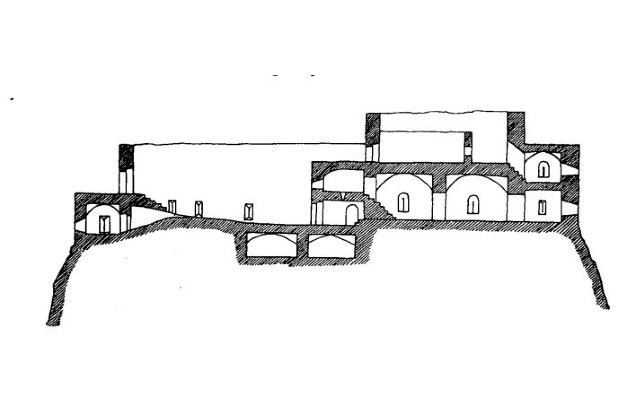
Cross section view of the fort

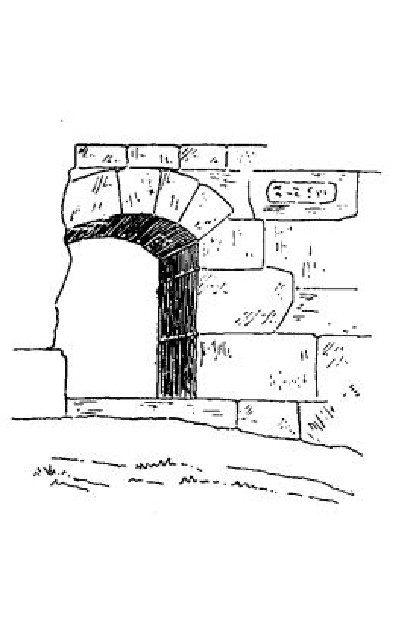
Main gate of the fort

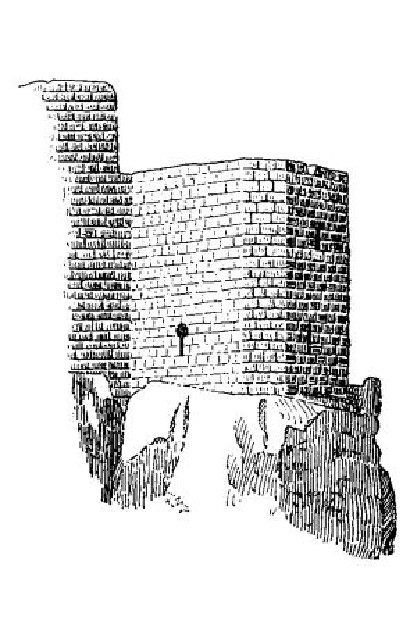
West tower

== See also ==
- Museiliha inscription – First-century AD inscribed boundary marker
- Gigarta – Ancient settlement in North Lebanon
