= Gigarta =

Ancient settlement in North Lebanon

Gigarta (also known as Gigartus in classical sources) was an ancient settlement in northern Lebanon. Noted primarily in the Museiliha inscription found in the vicinity of the Mseilha Fort, Gigarta appears to have been involved in a territorial dispute with Caesarea ad Libanum (modern Arqa) during the first century AD. Historical accounts suggest that Gigarta's status was below that of a fully developed Roman city (civitas), yet above that of a minor settlement or hamlet (vicus). Gigarta's precise location remains unknown; scholars have speculated that it may correspond to either modern-day Gharzouz, Zgharta, or Hannouch, all localities in North Lebanon.

== In ancient sources ==
Gigarta's location has not been securely identified. Ancient literary and epigraphic sources place it in northern Lebanon, on or near the western slopes of Mount Lebanon. First century AD Greek geographer Strabo refers the place as "Gigartus", one of the strongholds of the "Arabians and Itureans", and describes its location as being on the slopes of the Libanus (Mount Lebanon). Pliny the Elder writing in the first century AD, situated Gigarta between Tripolis to the north and Botrys to the south. The Museiliha inscription referencing Gigarta was discovered in Aabrine, south of the promontory of Ras ash-Shaq'a. It was reported to have been transported from its findspot in the vicinity of the Mseilha Fort. This inscription, now housed in the Louvre Museum, is in Latin and records a boundary-marking operation between Caesarea ad Libanum and the people of Gigarta, from the vicus (village) of the Sidonians, on the order of a procurator. Aliquot notes that Gigarta does not appear to have attained the status of a civitas, even during the early Byzantine period (330–717). Byzantine geographer George of Cyprus, writing as late as the early seventh century, still referred to it as a village.

== Interpretation and location ==
French orientalist Ernest Renan suggested that Gigarta is modern Gharzouz, while French archeologist René Dussaud proposed present-day Zgharta, based on proximity and descriptions from ancient texts. In 2005, Lebanese archaeologist Hassan Salame-Sarkis proposed that Gigarta may correspond to the location of the site known as Hannouch (or Selaata) situated on the coast near Batroun. Sarkis based his identification of Gigarta on findings including remnants of a Byzantine basilica and other ancient structures in Hannouch. Salame-Sarkis based the proposed identification partly on Hannouch's position on the route toward Arqa and its proximity to the reported provenance of the Museiliha inscription. According to French historian Julien Aliquot, Gigarta was a settlement of greater statutory importance than a vicus but of lower rank than a city: it was probably the capital of a more or less fragmented canton or pagus, comprising one or more vici, including the one called "vicus of the Sidonians" mentioned in the Museiliha inscription.
