= Hamat =

Village in Batroun District, Lebanon

Hamat حامات
- Village
- Location within Lebanon
- Coordinates: 34°17′N 35°41′E
- Country: Lebanon
- Governorate: North Governorate
- District: Batroun District
- Elevation: 287 m (942 ft)
- Time zone: UTC+2 (EET)
  - Summer (DST): UTC+3 (EEST)
- Dialing code: +961

Hamat (Arabic: حامات, romanized: Ḥāmāt) is a village in Lebanon. It is located 287 meters high on the historic Ras ash-Shaq'a. It is home to the historic shrine and monastery of Our Lady of Nourieh. The village is also home to Saint Elias Church, which overlooks Nahr al-Jaouz River, and the coastal town of Batroun (not to be confused with the batroun district) one of the oldest continuously-inhabited cities in the world. Other historic sites are St. Simeon Monastery and Hamat Old Tunnel.

The Ras ash-Shaq'a, known in antiquity as the Theoprosopon, is large coastal cape between the ancient cities of Batroun and Tripoli, Lebanon that forms a significant barrier along the Lebanese coast.

== Demographics ==
In 2014 Christians made up 99.37% of registered voters in Hamat. 88.65% of the voters were Greek Orthodox.

== Historical Military Use ==
During the Lebanese Civil War, a runway called Pierre Gemayel International Airport was built in Hamat in 1976 by the Kataeb party for civilian and military use. Before it was finished, the Syrian army took control and used it for helicopters. Since 2005, the Lebanese Army has controlled the site and still uses it for helicopter operations.
