= Nahr al-Jaouz =

River in Lebanon

Nahr Al-Jaouz (Al-Jaouz River)
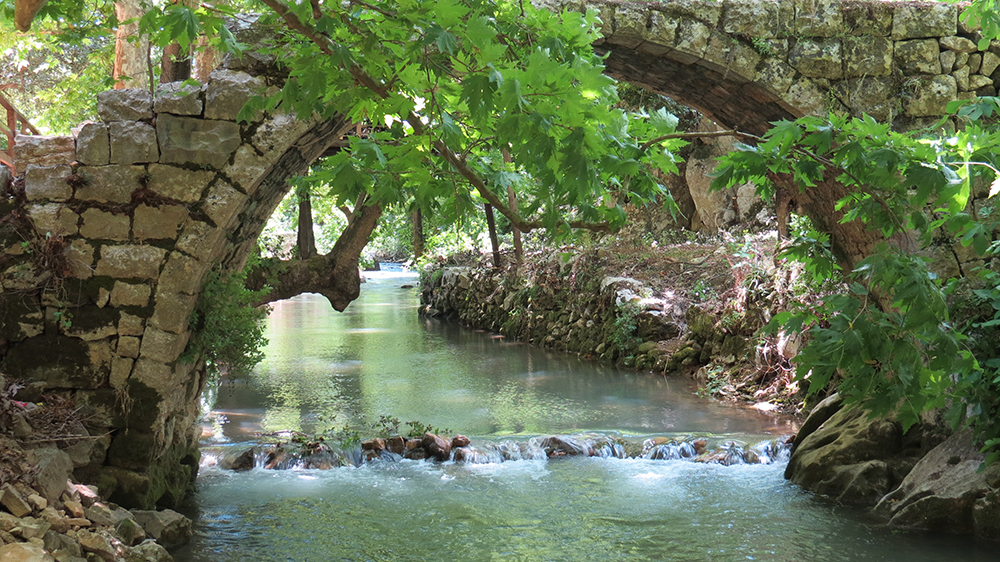
- Medieval bridge on Nahr al-Jaouz
- Native name: نهر الجوز (Arabic)

Location
- Country: Lebanon

Physical characteristics
- Source: Jurd Tannourine
- Mouth: Mediterranean Sea
  - location: Batroun
  - coordinates: 34°16′2″N 35°39′27″E
  - elevation: 0 metres (0 ft)
- Length: 32.3 kilometres (20.1 mi)

Nahr al-Jaouz (also Al-Joz, Al-Jawz, Levantine Arabic: نهر الجوز, romanized: Nahr al-Jōz, lit. 'Walnut River') is a perennial river in the Batroun District of North Lebanon. It rises in the highlands of the Jurd (highlands) of Tannourine and flows westward through a steep valley to empty into the Mediterranean Sea near Batroun. The river's basin is underlain by limestone like adjacent North Lebanon watersheds. The main channel is about 32–38 km long; one recent study measured its length as roughly 32.3 km (20.1 miles) from source to mouth. It descends from the Tannourine plateau down through terraced hillsides before reaching the coastal plain just south of the Ras ash-Shaq'a promontory and the Ottoman-era Mseilha Fort. The Nahr al-Jaouz passes by villages such as Kfar Helda and Batroun, and its valley has traditionally been heavily cultivated and irrigated.

== Hydrology and environment ==
The river is perennial, with its highest discharge in winter and spring and its lowest in summer. Rainfall and snowmelt contribute to its seasonal flow. Average annual discharge is on the order of 74–76 million m^{3} (about 2.4 m^{3}/s), with peak flows after winter storms and minimal flow in summer. The flow of the river is very variable with one hydro-oceanographic study reported an April 2003 discharge of 45.6 million m^{3}, while June flows were almost nil (only 3.2 million m^{3}). The river's flow is captured by the Mseilha Dam, built near Batroun on Nahr el-Jaouz, upstream of the historic Mseilha Fort, to store winter runoff and provide potable and irrigation water. The Lebanese National Water Sector plan and recent engineering studies note that the Mseilha Dam impounds the Nahr al-Jaouz to supply drinking water for Batroun and neighboring Koura District and to irrigate roughly 1,000 hectares of farmland north of the river.

The river brings nutrient-rich water from upland springs. Recent field surveys of summer water quality found very high nitrate concentrations, about 35.6 mg/L at the Kfar Helda/Batroun sampling site, well above World Health Organization guidelines for irrigation. Phosphate levels are typically low (0.09 mg/L in the same survey). Microbiological testing in June 2023 showed only low bacterial contamination at Batroun (Escherichia coli ≈3 CFU/100 mL and fecal coliforms ≈3 CFU/100 mL).

In the upper valley the riparian corridor is lined with ancient terraced orchards and pine-oak woodlands; downstream the river irrigates the gardens and fields of Batroun's coastal plain. Historically the river's reliable water supported extensive olive groves and other crops. In the lower valley there is a network of traditional irrigation channels, long stone-lined aqueducts, built during the French Mandate, and earlier Ottoman times, to distribute river water to fields.

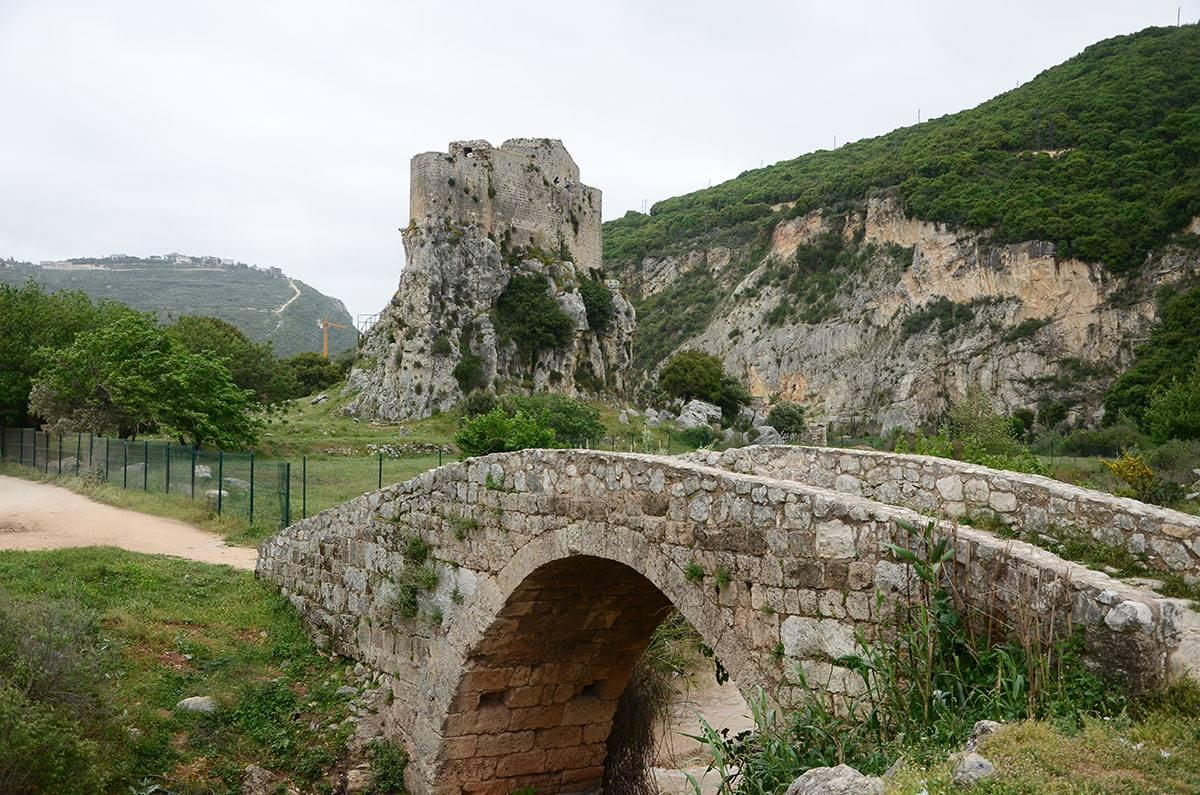
Mseilha Fort and medieval bridge

== History and cultural heritage ==
Archaeological surveys report human activity from Neolithic through Bronze and Iron Age times, and continuous settlement and use during the medieval and Ottoman periods. In recent surveys around Batroun, archaeologists identified over 100 sites along the Jaouz Valley, including rock-cut tombs and ruins ranging from early Christian (Byzantine/Mamluk) to Ottoman periods. Survey teams documented Ottoman-era water mills and abandoned farmsteads directly on the Nahr al-Jaouz. Bradbury's survey recorded stone and concrete irrigation channels dating from the Ottoman and Mandate periods. The 17th-century Mseilha Fort is sited on a limestone escarpment overlooking Nahr al-Jaouz.
