= List of Lebanese monuments =

List of Lebanese monuments

- Baalbek Temples
- Baalbek Stones
- Beaufort Castle
- Beiteddine Palace in Beiteddine
- Byblos Castle in Byblos
- Cardo Decumanus Crossing
- Cedars of God in North Lebanon
- Deir al-Qamar
- Fakhreddine Palace in Chouf District
- Jeita Grotto
- Hope for Peace Monument
- Iaat Columm
- Kadisha Valley
- Kamouh el Hermel
- Martyrs' Square Monument
- Moussa Castle
- Mseilha Fort
- Omari Mosque in Beirut
- Our Lady of Lebanon in Harissa
- Phoenician Wall in Batroun
- Qoubbat Douris
- Rachid Karami International Fair in Tripoli
- Raouche Rocks in Beirut
- Roman Baths, Beirut
- Sidon Sea Castle
- Tripoli Citadel
- Saint George Greek Orthodox Cathedral in Beirut
- Saint George Maronite Catholic Cathedral in Beirut
- Saint Louis Castle in Sidon
- Toron Castle in Tibnine
- Tyre Necropolis
- Umayyad Ruins in Anjar
