= Museiliha inscription =

First-century AD inscribed boundary marker

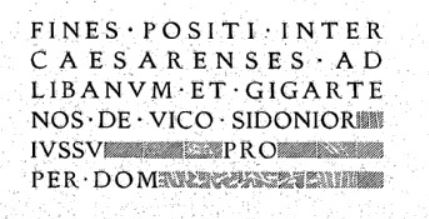
- Reproduction transcription of the Museiliha inscription from Ernest Renan's Mission de Phénicie
- Material: Limestone
- Size: 40 cm × 54 cm × 2 cm (15.75 in × 21.26 in × 0.79 in)
- Writing: Latin
- Created: 75–100 AD
- Discovered: Described in 1863; Reportedly discovered in the vicinity of the Mseilha Fort, documented in Aabrine, Lebanon
- Discovered by: Residents of the town of Aabrine in Lebanon
- Present location: Louvre
- Identification: CIL 03, 00183; ILS 5974; AE 1941, 0081

The Museiliha inscription is a first-century AD Roman boundary marker that was first documented by French orientalist Ernest Renan in 1864. Inscribed in Latin, the stone records a boundary set between the citizens of Caesarea ad Libanum (modern Arqa) and Gigarta (possibly present-day Gharzouz, Zgharta, or Hannouch), hinting at a border dispute. The personal name of the involved Roman administrator was deliberately erased. The inscription was named after its reported findspot, the medieval Mseilha Fort, located in Northern Lebanon; it is now held in the Louvre's collection.

== Discovery and disposition ==
External image
- Image of the Museiliha inscription from the Louvre museum collections website, retrieved 22 January 2025

The marker was reportedly found at the Mseilha Fort by residents of the nearby village of Aabrine, who brought it back to their town. The nineteenth-century French orientalist Ernest Renan, who led the first systematic archaeological survey of in 1860–1861, acquired the inscription and documented it in his report, Mission de Phénicie. (Note: Renan published Mission de Phénicie between 1864–1874 which included Theodor Mommsen's reading of the Museiliha inscription, later included in CIL 03, 00183) The stone was transferred to the Louvre, where the German archaeologist and then-museum curator Wilhelm Fröhner studied the inscription and provided the first authoritative translation of the text in 1863. Fröhner's reading was corrected ten years later by the German classical scholar and epigrapher Theodor Mommsen.

== Description and interpretation ==
The Museiliha boundary marker is crafted from limestone; it measures 40 cm (16 in) in height, 54 cm (21 in) in width, and 23 cm (9.1 in) in depth. (Note: Fröhner initially described the material as marble.) The stone bears an inscription of six surviving lines in Latin, hinting at a border dispute which was probably settled through a legal judgment defining the boundaries between the citizens of Caesarea ad Libanum (modern Arqa) and Gigarta. Starting from the fifth line of the inscription, a personal name appears to have been chiseled out, erasing the identity of the administrator mentioned in the inscription.

Line	Mommsen's reconstruction	Mancini's reconstruction
(1)	FINES·POSITI·INTER	FINES·POSITI·INTER
(2)	CAESARENSES·AD	CAESARENSES·AD
(3)	LIBANVM·ET·GIGARTE	LIBANVM·ET·GIGARTE
(4)	NOS·DE·VICO·SIDONIOR[VM]	NOS·DE·VICO·SIDONIOR
(5)	IVSSV ⟦......⟧ PRO[C(VRATORIS)·AVG(VSTI)]	IVSSV [PISONIS·] PR[O·PR]
(6)	PER·DOM[ITIVM...........]	PER·DOM[ITIVM·CELE]
*		[REM·LEGATVM·EIVS]
Intentionally erased characters in antiquity are marked with ⟦......⟧. Reconstructed text is enclosed in [square brackets], and text enclosed in (round brackets) denotes abbreviation in the text or inferred from the context that were expanded or resolved by scholars. (Note: For the use of the Leiden Conventions, see Bagnall 2015.) * Supplemental line extrapolated by Mancini from the inscription's context.

In his 1873 reconstruction, Mommsen rendered the illegible characters as "pro[c(urator)] [of Aug(ustus)]" and "DOM[ITIVM...........]. The inscription, translated and restored by Mommsen, reads:

Boundaries were established between the citizens of Caesarea ad Libanum and the Gigartenians of the vicus of the Sidonians, by order of ⟦......⟧, procurator of Augustus, through Domitius...

Mommsen made no attempt at identifying the administrator whose name was obscured, but later scholars have proposed possible candidates based on historical context and surviving epigraphic patterns. The 19th century avocational classicist Carmine Antonio "Carmelo" Mancini suggested that the erasure was a case of damnatio memoriae, a practice of removing details about a disgraced person from official records and accounts. Mancini consequently proposed Gnaeus Calpurnius Piso as the erased official. Piso was a disgraced first-century AD Roman politician and governor of Roman Syria. Mancini provided an alternative to Mommsen's reading, restoring the term pro praetore in the inscription instead of procuratoris ('of the procurator'). Mancini believed the inscription referred to a praetor rather than a procurator because placing public boundary markers was not within the competence of procurators, who were financial magistrates. Instead, this responsibility would have fallen under the authority of a Legatus Augusti pro praetore — a governor with both military and administrative authority in a province. Mancini's reconstruction is translated as follows:"Boundaries were established between the citizens of Caesarea ad Libanum and the Gigartenians of the vicus of the Sidonians, by order of propraetor Piso through Domitius Celer, his legate." Writing in 1940, the French archaeologist Daniel Schlumberger's proposed Avidius Cassius or Pescennius Niger, both once imperial legates of Syria, as potential individuals whose names were erased on the boundary stone, likely due to their status as usurpers of the Roman Empire. Avidius Cassius had declared himself emperor in 175 AD against Emperor Marcus Aurelius but was assassinated shortly thereafter. Pescennius Niger was proclaimed emperor by his troops in 193 AD following the assassination of Emperor Pertinax, leading to a war against Septimius Severus, which he ultimately lost, resulting in his death in 194.

In addition to discussions about the obscured administrator's identity, researchers analyzed the geographical clues in the inscription. Renan identified Gigarta as modern Gharzouz, approximately 45 kilometers (28 mi) away from Caesarea ad Libanum. In his 1873 commentary, Mommsen suggested that because the cities of Caesarea ad Libanum and Gigarta were not neighboring, the land in question likely was an enclave that belonged to Caesarea ad Libanum and was situated beyond its territory, adjacent to an area inhabited by the Gigartans living in a Sidonian vicus. The French archaeologist René Dussaud proposed that Gigarta might correspond to present-day Zgharta. Later scholars reexamined the question of the status of Caesarea ad Libanum, Gigarta, and the vicus of the Sidonians. Schlumberger believed that the vicus was one of the three districts of Tripoli, to which the administration of the village of Gigarta would have been entrusted, while the scholar Jean-Paul Rey-Coquais posited that it was a village under the jurisdiction of the city of Gigarta. The French historian Julien Aliquot supports the latter proposition as the text clearly indicates that the vicus of the Sidonians depended on Gigarta in his 2009 publication. The Lebanese archaeologist Hassan Salame-Sarkis suggested that Gigarta could be identified with the site of Hannouch (or Selaata), near the coast close to Batroun. Sarkis based his 2005 hypothesis on archaeological findings at Hannouch, including remnants of a Byzantine basilica and other ancient structures, suggesting historical importance that aligns with classical accounts of Gigarta. Sarkis argued that Hannouch's proximity to the ancient route toward Arqa, along with its closeness to the findspot of the Museiliha inscription, supports its identification with the ancient settlement.

== Dating ==
In 1915, Gustave Adolphus Harrer, a professor of classics at Princeton University, tentatively dated the inscription to the second century AD. In his 1940 analysis, Schlumberger proposed that the erased name on the Museiliha inscription could correspond to Avidius Cassius or Pescennius Niger, both of whom were active in the second century AD. Scholars since have revised this dating to the first century AD, based on evidence of Roman administrative practices and language usage. The presence of Latin in the inscription points to an early Roman period, likely soon after the region became part of the Roman Empire. The specific involvement of a Roman procurator to resolve a territorial dispute between Caesarea ad Libanum, a recognized city, and Gigarta, which was not a recognized civitas, further supports a mid-first-century date, aligning with the period shortly after Sohaimos, the Iturean king of North Lebanon, died in 49 AD. At this time, the Iturean territories, including Gigarta, likely fell under the direct oversight of a procurator within the Roman province of Roman Syria, a model similar to administrative solutions implemented in neighboring regions such as Palestine. According to the Louvre Museum, the inscription is tentatively dated to the fourth quarter of the first century AD.

== Disposition ==
The boundary stone was acquired by the Louvre and is cataloged under inventory number AO 4898 in the Department of Greek, Etruscan, and Roman Antiquities. (Note: Not on display.)

== See also ==
- Bodashtart inscriptions – Phoenician inscriptions from the 6th century BC
- Byblian royal inscriptions – Five inscriptions from Byblos written in an early type of Phoenician script
- Leiden Conventions – Symbols for marking text from manuscripts
- Tower of Qalaat Faqra – Roman-period tower in Mount Lebanon
