= Jeita =

Jeita جعيتا Jaita, Jaaita
- Municipality
- Location in Lebanon
- Coordinates: 33°57′14″N 35°38′36″E
- Country: Lebanon
- Governorate: Keserwan-Jbeil
- District: Keserwan
- Time zone: UTC+2 (EET)
  - Summer (DST): UTC+3 (EEST)

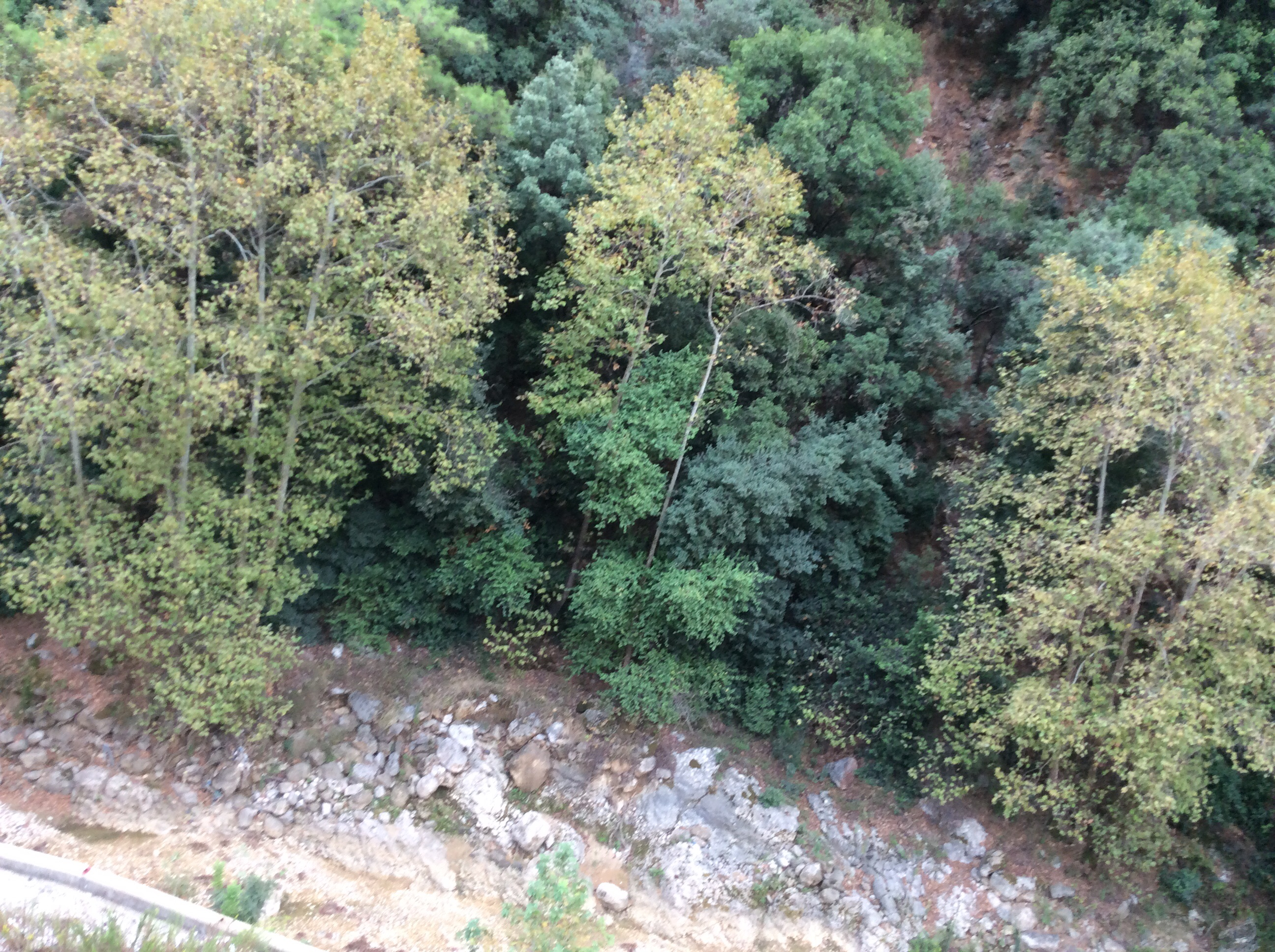
Near Jaeta (Jeita), Lebanon, 2014.

Jeita (Arabic: جعيتا Jʿītā; also spelled Jaaita or Jaita) is a town and municipality located in the Keserwan District of the Keserwan-Jbeil Governorate of Lebanon. The town is about 20 kilometres (12 mi) north of Beirut. It has an average elevation of 380 meters above sea level and a total land area of 290 hectares. Jeita's inhabitants are Maronites.

It is well known for the Jeita Grotto which is a popular tourist attraction, as well as the Nahr al-Kalb, a river that runs from a spring near the grotto emptying into the Mediterranean Sea. The name Jeita is derived from the Aramaic word Ge’itta, meaning "roar" or "noise".

== History ==
In 1838, Eli Smith noted Ja'ita as a village located in "Aklim el-Kesrawan, Northeast of Beirut; the chief seat of the Maronites".

== Bibliography ==
- Robinson, E.; Smith, E. (1841). Biblical Researches in Palestine, Mount Sinai and Arabia Petraea: A Journal of Travels in the year 1838. Vol. 3. Boston: Crocker & Brewster.
