= Jeita Grotto =

Cave in Lebanon

Jeita Grotto مغارة جعيتا
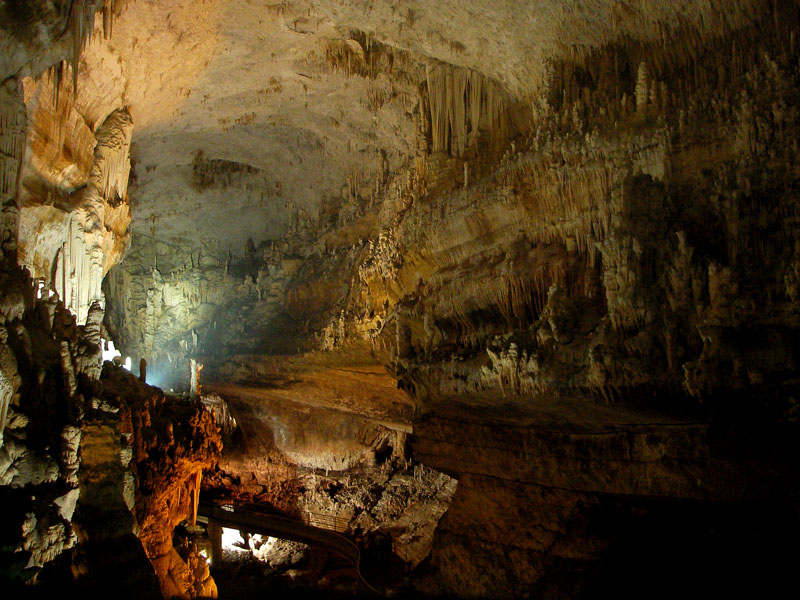
- Upper cave at Jeita with the walkway
- Interactive map of Jeita Grotto مغارة جعيتا
- Location: Jeita, Lebanon
- Coordinates: 33°56′36.20″N 35°38′28.89″E
- Length: 9 kilometres (6 mi)
- Discovery: 1836
- Geology: Karstic
- Entrances: 2
- Difficulty: none
- Access: Jeita Grotto official website
- Translation: roar or noise (water) (Aramaic)

The Jeita Grotto (Arabic: مغارة جعيتا) is a system of two separate, but interconnected, karstic limestone caves spanning an overall length of nearly 9 kilometres (5.6 mi). The caves are situated in the Nahr al-Kalb river valley within the locality of Jeita, 18 kilometres (11 mi) north of the Lebanese capital Beirut. Though inhabited in prehistoric times, the lower cave was not rediscovered until 1836 by Reverend William Thomson; it can only be visited by boat since it channels an underground river that provides fresh drinking water to more than a million Lebanese.

In 1958, Lebanese speleologists George Farra and Sami Karkabi discovered the upper galleries 60 metres (200 ft) above the lower cave which have been accommodated with an access tunnel and a series of walkways to enable tourists safe access without disturbing the natural landscape. The upper galleries house the world's largest known stalactite. The galleries are composed of a series of chambers the largest of which peaks at a height of 12 metres (39 ft).

== Location ==
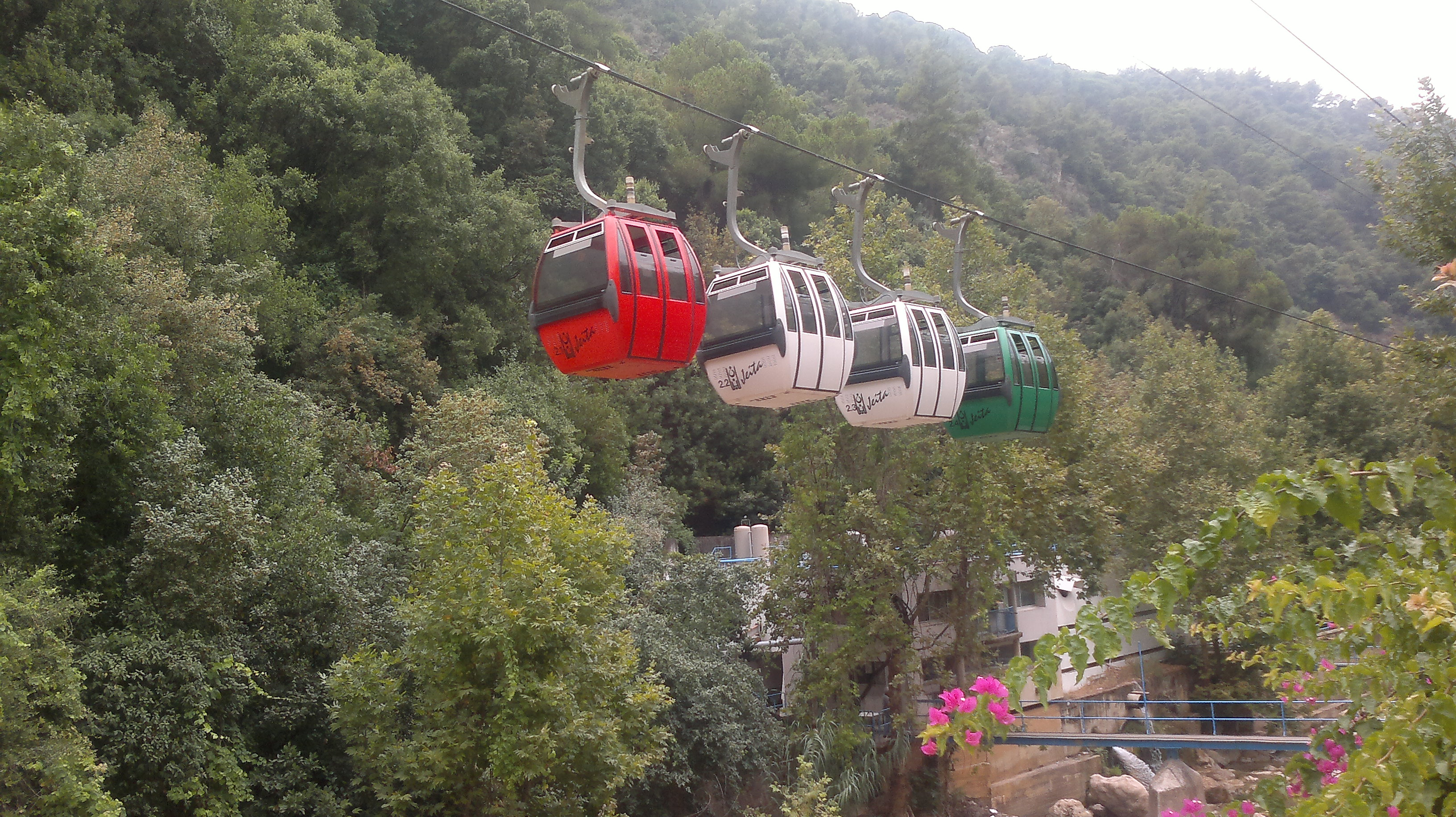
Cableway that transports visitors to the area of the grotto

The Jeita cave is situated at the center of the western flanks of the Lebanon mountains, more specifically in the Nahr al-Kalb valley, its natural entrance is about 100 metres (330 ft) above sea level. It's located 5 kilometres (3.1 mi) east of the Mediterranean coastline and 18 kilometres (11 mi) north of Beirut within the confines of the municipality of Jeita, in the caza of Keserwan.

== History ==
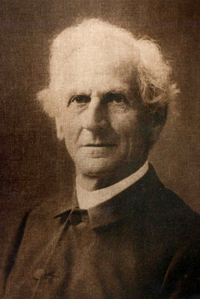
Reverend Daniel L. Bliss, one of the first modern explorers of Jeita Grotto

The modern discovery of the underground river of Jeita in 1836 is credited to Reverend William Thomson (an American missionary) who ventured some 50 metres (160 ft) into the cave. Reaching the underground river, he fired a shot from his gun and the resulting echoes convinced him that he had found a cavern of major importance.

In 1873 W.J. Maxwell and H.G. Huxley, engineers with the Beirut Water Company, and Reverend Daniel Bliss, the president of the Syrian Protestant College (later the American University of Beirut) explored these caverns. In two expeditions carried out in 1873 and 1874, they penetrated 1,060 metres (3,480 ft) into the grotto before finding their progress blocked by an underground waterfall. The waterfall became known as "Hell's Rapids", as the torrents break onto razor sharp rocks. Dr. Bliss, Mr. Maxwell, and the other engineers recorded their names and the year on "Maxwell's Column", a great limestone pillar some 625 metres (2,051 ft) from the entrance. About 200 metres (660 ft) further on, in the so-called "Pantheon", they wrote their names and details of the expedition on paper, sealed it in a bottle and placed it on top of a stalagmite. The lime-impregnated water has since covered the bottle with a thin white film, permanently fixing it to the stone.

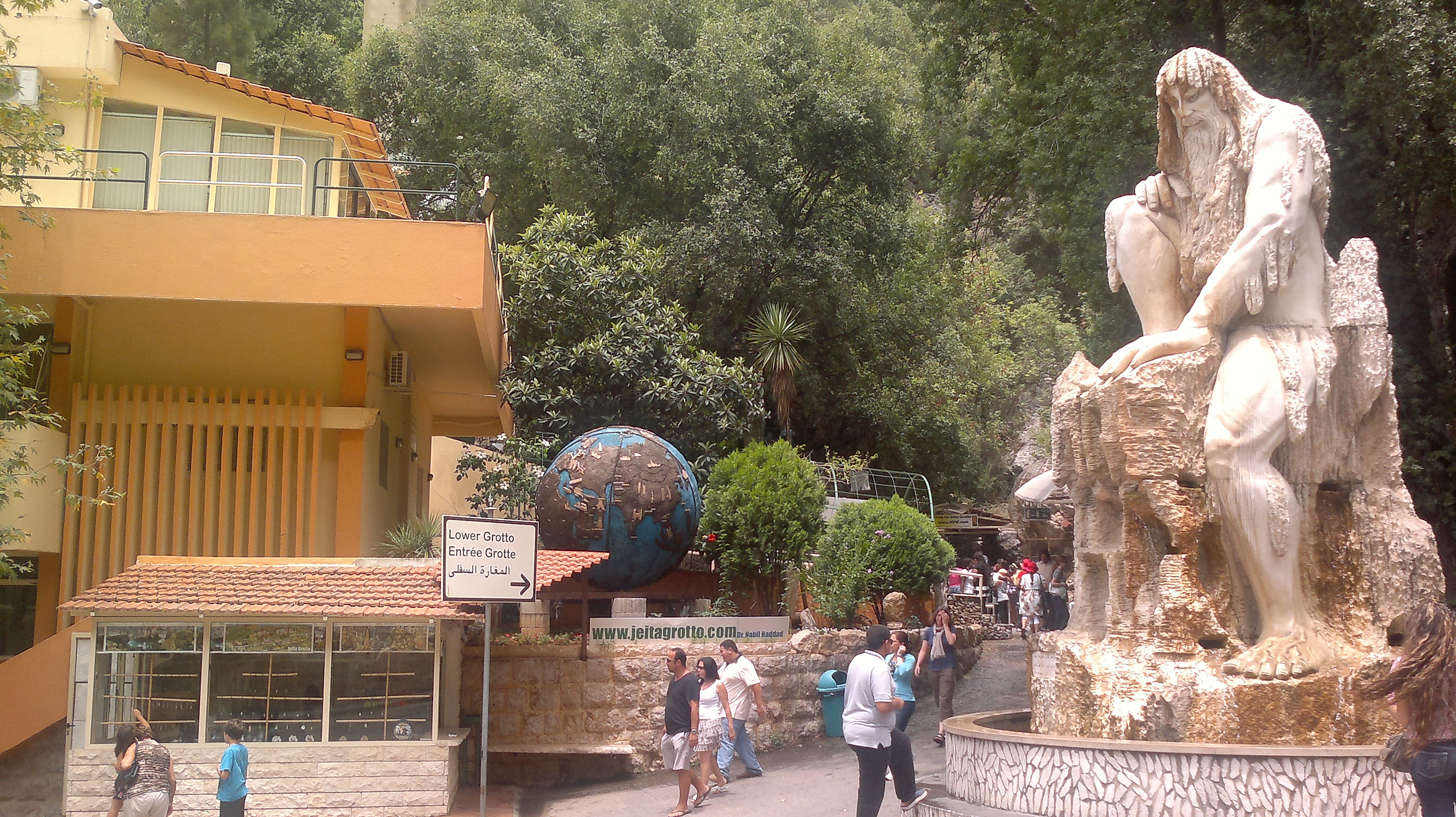
"The Guardian of Time", a sculpture by Lebanese artist Tony Farah outside the lower cave at Jeita.

Between 1892 and 1940 further expeditions were carried out by English, American, and French explorers. Their expeditions brought them to a depth of 1,750 metres (5,740 ft). Since the 1940s, Lebanese explorers have pushed even deeper into the Jeita grotto. Many of these spelunkers are members of the Speleo Club du Liban (Lebanese Caving Club) founded in 1951 by the first Lebanese speleologists Lionel Ghorra, Albert Anavi, Raymond Khawam and Sami Karkabi. Their expeditions revealed a great underground system which is now explored to an overall length of nearly 9 kilometres (5.6 mi). In 1958 the lower caverns were opened to the public, meanwhile exploration was still underway mainly by the Lebanese Caving Club. This exploration led to the discovery of the elevated dry branch of the grotto later referred to as the upper galleries. In 1962, the Spéléo Club contributed to a study of the upper galleries aiming to provide an access tunnel which was to be dug for touristic development purposes. Work on the access tunnel was begun in 1968. Its opening was followed by the installation of a series of walkways which permitted tourists safe access to the upper galleries without disturbing the natural landscape.

In 1969, a concert with electronic music by the French composer Francois Bayle was held in the cave to celebrate the inauguration of the upper galleries. This event was organized by the Lebanese artist and sculptor Ghassan Klink. Other cultural events have taken place in this unusual surrounding, including a concert by the world acknowledged German composer Karlheinz Stockhausen in November 1969, and more recently, in 2008 a classical music concert by Lebanese-Armenian composer and pianist Guy Manoukian. The caverns closed to the public due to the Lebanese civil war in 1978; both tunnels leading to the lower and upper galleries were used to store munitions, and the outside buildings for military purposes. The caves reopened in 1995 and remain one of the country's key natural attractions. On October 31, 2025, the caves were illegally used as a wedding venue by a Lebanese-Italian couple, prompting national outrage and the prime minister to order the opening of an investigation. The caverns were closed in early November, but were reopened on November 15, as experts claim no harm was caused to the caves.

== Archaeology ==
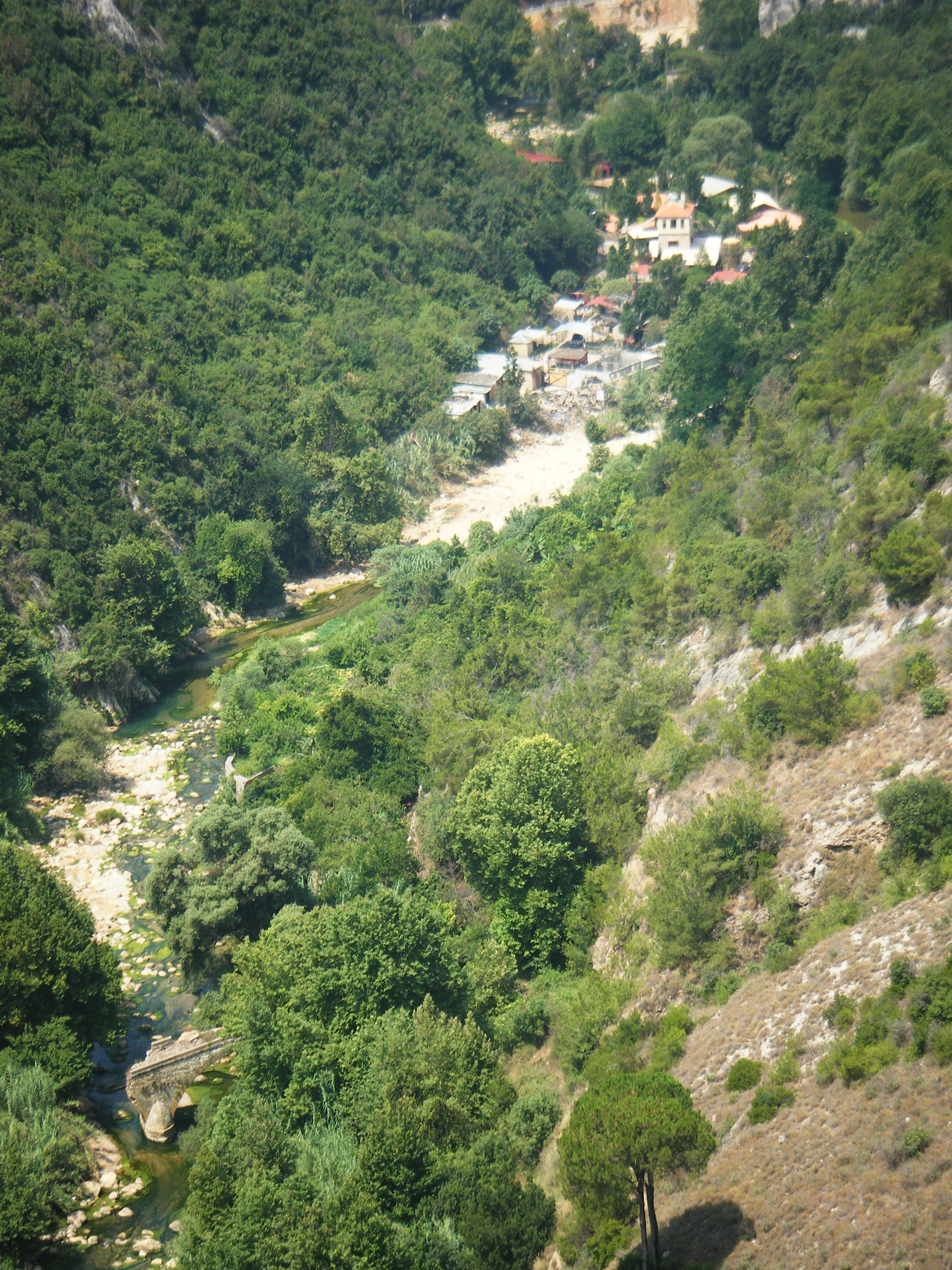
Valley and river near the grotto

Jeita I (sometimes referred to as Nahr-el-Kelb) is a dry cave, 56 metres (184 ft) deep to the east of the source cave from where the river flows and connected to it by narrow channels. It was first noted in 1833 by Botta and excavated by Godefroy Zumoffen in two positions in 1898, 1900, 1908 and 1910. It was later excavated by Auguste Bergy with materials from both excavations now with the Museum of Lebanese Prehistory, the Archaeological Museum of the American University of Beirut, and the private collection of Dr. Gigues. Henri Fleisch noticed an Upper Paleolithic level with further finds including polished Neolithic pieces, primitive potsherds, burned bones, and end scrapers. Jacques Cauvin noted similarities in these finds to the Néolithique Moyen period of Byblos. Evidence of later occupation included a Chalcolithic tripod pot found by Father Fleisch and a combed-ware sherd suggested to date to the Early Bronze Age levels at Byblos.

Jeita II (Dahr el-Mghara) is a rock shelter situated on a platform, above and equidistant between the dry cave of Jeita I and the entrance to the grotto at Jeita III. Excavations were made by the Duc de Luynes and Lartet in 1864, by Zumoffen in 1900 and 1908 and by Bergy in 1930. A large number of flint tools, bones, and hearths were found that were accredited to the Aurignacian. Further excavations were made in 1964 by Francis Hours which revealed much more extensive, deeper and richer deposits than had previously been suspected. Father Hours permitted Lorraine Copeland to disclose that the upper material appeared to display late Upper Paleolithic or early Mesolithic characteristics, probably including Kebaran. Excavation was to be continued but the area was fenced off and owned by the government.

Jeita III (The Caverns) was a deposit of brown soil that fell from a location suggested to be at the east end of Jeita II, just inside the entrance to the grotto where the tourists are conducted by boat. It was found in 1963 by the Speleologists Club and excavated by Father Hours. Flint tools found in the deposit were geometric in design and suggested to be a form of Natufian or later Mesolithic than discovered at Jeita II, from where it may have been displaced. Forms of these flints included rectangles with straight or oblique truncation, borers of the "crochet" type, micro-burins, end scrapers, bladelet cores, two transverse arrowheads, crescents, and short triangles. Some of the crescents had ridged backs and resembled those found at Nahal Oren. Material is stored with the Museum of Lebanese Prehistory.

Jeita IV (Mugharet-el-Mal) is a rock shelter in the cliff upstream from the grotto. It once contained a large quantity of Paleolithic material which has been looted and was deemed unfit for excavation by Sami Karkaby, Director of the Caverns in 1965. Study of the lithic remains at this shelter were hoped to shed further light on the Paleolithic or Mesolithic communities that inhabited the different sites at different times.

== Geology ==
Lower cave at Jeita.

The Jeita grotto is located within the Lower-Middle Jurassic strata of Keserouane which has a stratigraphic thickness of 1,000 metres (3,300 ft) and consists of dolomite and micritic limestone. The Keserouane formation was exposed to air by a local uplift during the Late Jurassic-Early Cretaceous. The Keserouane strata became karstified after its aerial exposure and then was buried during the Cretaceous. In the Neogene, upon the final uplift of Mount Lebanon, this early karstification phase was reactivated.

At the Nahr al-Kalb valley, the impervious Upper Jurassic volcanic rocks and Lower Cretaceous sand slant almost vertically forming a hydrogeological barrier and forcing the outlet of the Jeita underground river to the surface. This barrier could be the reason for the westernmost, large cave chambers with heights exceeding 60 metres (200 ft). Karstification of the Keserouane limestone was further intensified by the steep topography of the area and the volume of precipitation over the Lebanon (more than 1200mm).

A ratio of total slope gradient of 1/100 is calculated between the entrance of the cave and its inland extremity. This shows its smooth flat course even though it is sometimes interrupted by several small cascades and rapids. From the west, the Jeita cave starts with large halls and meanders. Through some rapids, the dimension becomes narrower. Going forth, it is spacious with the Thompson's cavern (250 metres (820 ft) long and 60 metres (200 ft) wide), Grand Chaos (500 metres (1,600 ft) long) and Mroueh's Hall (200 metres (660 ft) long and 50 metres (160 ft) wide). The latter two are floored with collapsed blocks. The cave ends with a Y-shaped pattern, where, each branch ends with a siphon.

== Description ==
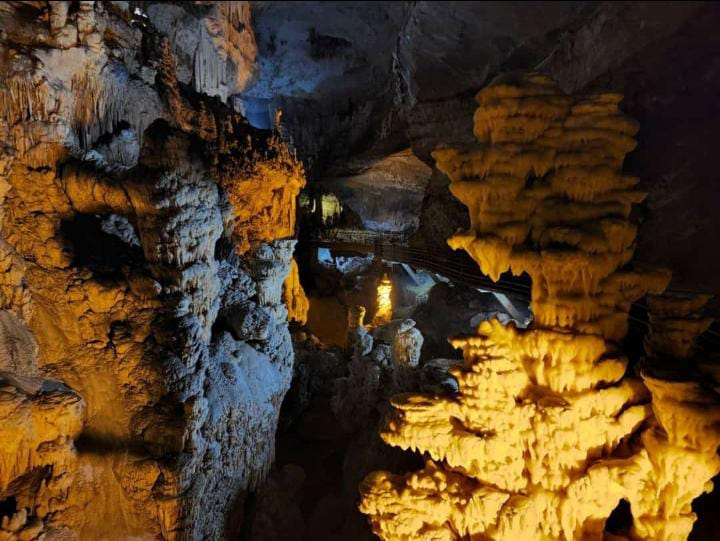
Formations and walkway in the grotto

The Jeita caves are solutional karst caves which have formed over millions of years due to the dissolution of limestone. The limestone is dissolved by carbonic acid charged rain water and groundwater; when the limestone, which is originally waterproof, contains cracks produced by tectonic forces the water oozes into the rock and starts to widen the cracks and solute caves inside the layers. Jeita is the longest cave complex in the Middle East; it sits at 300 metres (980 ft) above sea level and has a height difference of 305 metres (1,001 ft). Geologically, the caves provide a tunnel or escape route for the underground river, which is the principal source of Nahr al-Kalb.

The Jeita grotto is the longest explored cave in Lebanon. After many years of exploration, speleologists have penetrated about 6,200 metres (20,300 ft) from the entry point of the lower grotto to the far end of the underground river and about 2,130 metres (6,990 ft) of the upper galleries.

=== Upper cave ===
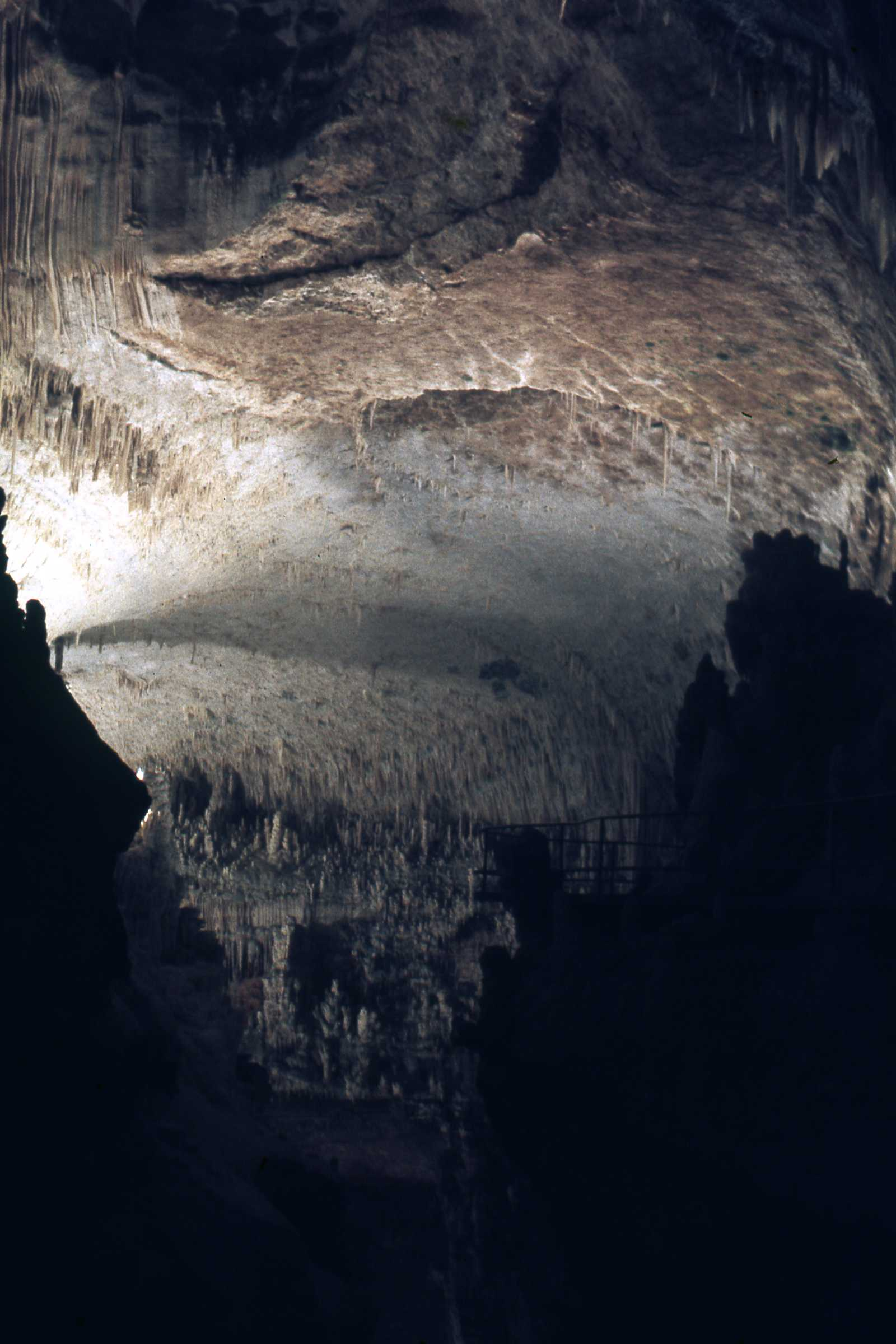
Roof of the cave

The Jeita upper cave has an overall length of 2,130 metres (6,990 ft) of which only 750 metres (2,460 ft) are accessible to visitors via a specially conceived walkway; access to the remainder of the cave was restricted to prevent ecological damage which may occur due to the flocking tourists. The upper cave contains a great concentration of a variety of crystallized formations such as stalactites, stalagmites, columns, mushrooms, ponds, curtains, and draperies. The upper gallery is famous for its formations, lit by an effective lighting system. It is entered through a 117 metres (384 ft) long concrete tunnel. The part accessible by visitors has three huge chambers. The first is called the White Chamber, the second Red Chamber. White dripstones are pure calcite without defilement, the red color is given by iron oxide (rust) in small amounts. In Lebanon, iron oxide has a red color instead of the brown beige color which is common in northern countries. The reason is a different chemical reaction caused by the high temperature which produces a different kind of iron oxide. The White Chamber is medium-sized, but has the most impressive formations of the cave. The Red Chamber is up to 106 metres (348 ft) high, and 30 metres (98 ft) to 50 metres (160 ft) wide. The third chamber is the biggest of all three chambers and has a height of more than 120 metres (390 ft). The longest stalactite in the world is located in Jeita's White Chamber; it measures 8.2 metres (27 ft) long.

=== Lower cave ===
The lower gallery which has an overall length of 6,200 metres (20,300 ft) is located 60 metres (200 ft) below the upper gallery. It is traversed by a smooth underwater river and a lake (the "Dark Lake"). The river is broken up by several small cataracts and rapids. The lower cave's "Thompson's Cavern", is a massive hall with impressive speleothems such as the Eagle Obelisk stalagmite. Other halls in the lower gallery include the Pantheon, Grand Chaos and Shangri-la. Visitors are transported in the lower gallery by electric boats for a distance of 500 metres (1,600 ft). In winter the lower level is closed, when the water level is too high.

== Economic and social importance ==
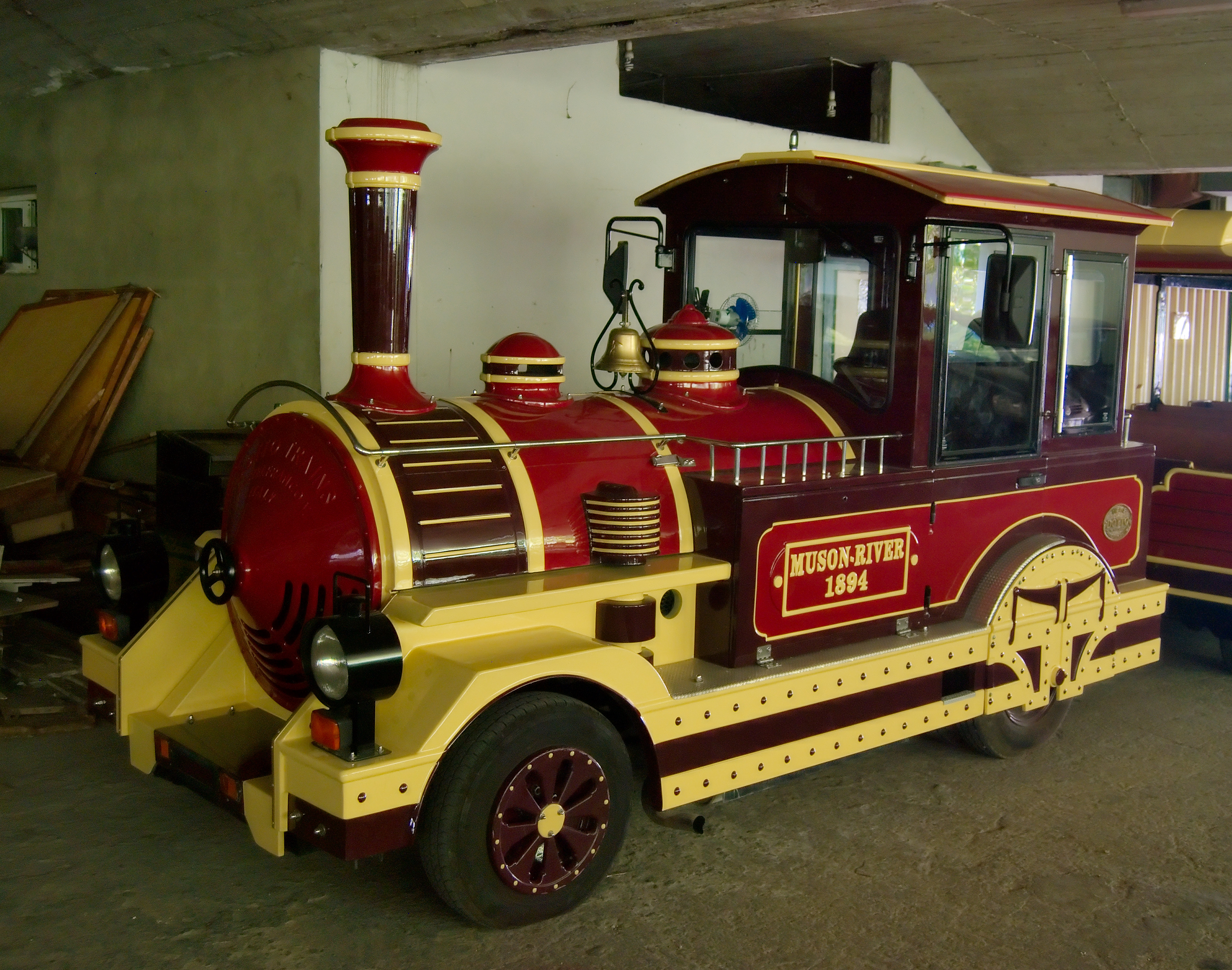
Engine that pulls the tourist train at the Jeita Grotto

Today, the Jeita Grotto is a popular recreational show cave and a major tourist attraction. It hosts approximately 280,000 visitors per year. The Jeita grotto contributes heavily to the public life of the region. MAPAS, the firm which runs the grotto, is an important employer and provides full-time jobs for around 115 local residents of Jeita (30% of which are female). In addition to employment, the Jeita caves contribute 5% of ticket fees to the local municipality, between 10 and 20% of general revenue to the Lebanese ministry of tourism, and an additional 10% of ticket fees along with the 10% VAT to the Lebanese ministry of Finance.

The grotto emits a spring with a flow ranging from 1–2 m^{3}/s, providing fresh drinking water for one-and-a-half million inhabitants of the capital, Beirut. However, water pollution, due to domestic and agricultural runoff, remains a serious concern as recent analysis detected an increasing presence of coliform bacteria.

== Awards ==
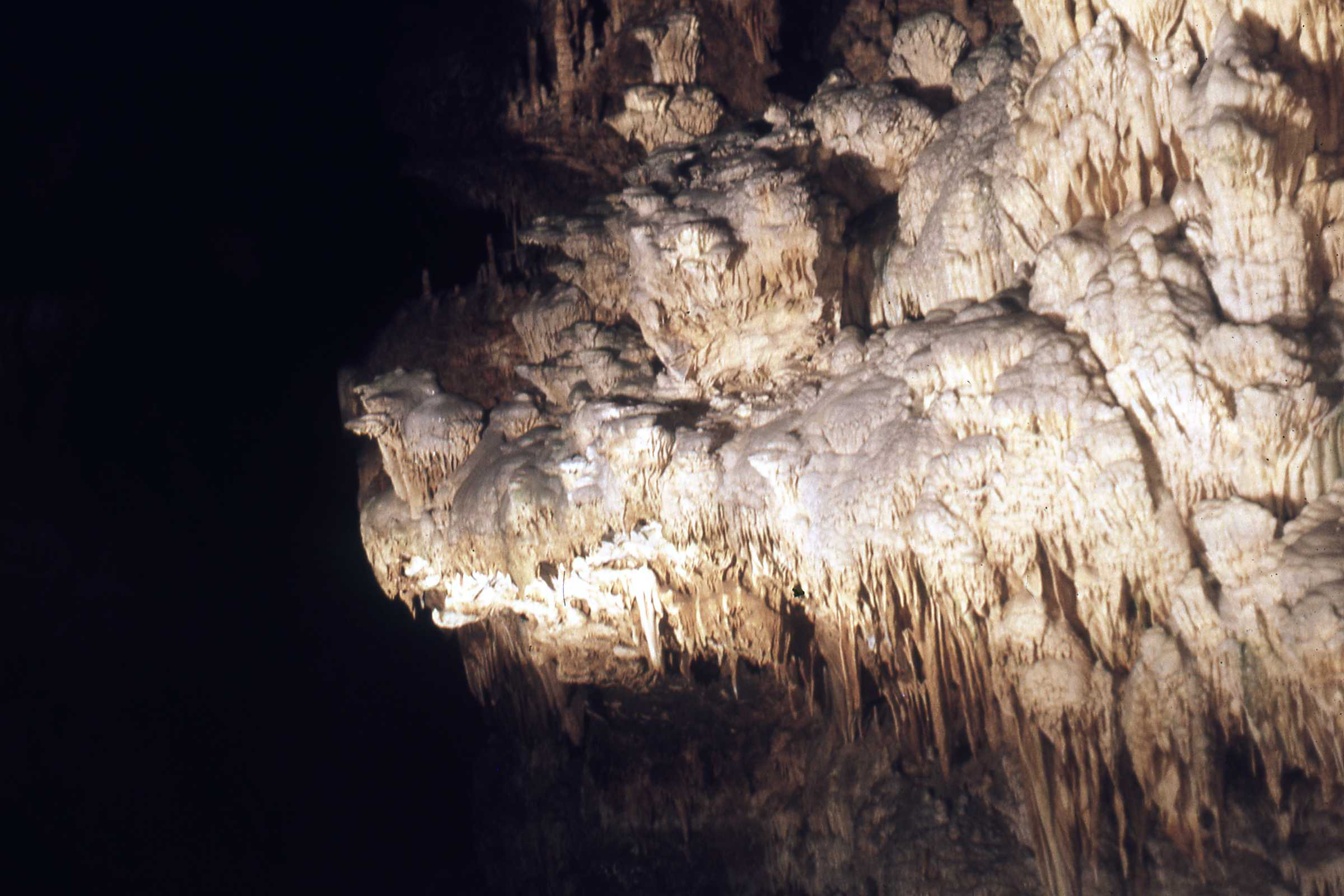
Formations in the cave

In 2002, then French President Jacques Chirac, the United Nations World Tourism Organization and the World Bank accorded the top Sustainable Development in Tourism prize to MAPAS, the company that manages the site, at a summit dubbed "New Ties between Tourism and Culture" in Geneva.

In December 2003, on behalf of the Beirut-based private company MAPAS, Jeita received a prestigious award from the fifth Tourism Summits in Chamonix, France. "Les sommets du tourisme" recognized MAPAS’ efforts in restoring Lebanon's important touristic sites.

The Jeita Grotto was a candidate for the New 7 Wonders of Nature competition. It was selected as one of 28 finalists and is the only cave to be selected among the nominees. The New7Wonders Foundation announced the new wonders of nature in 2011. Jeita was not on the list.

Other awards and certificates include:

- 2000 Certificate of Recognition from "Sukleen"-Lebanon for its sorting and recycling campaign.
- 2000 Appreciation from the Arab Musical Association".
- 1998 "Best Tourism Project" from the Lebanese Ministry of Tourism.
- 1997 International Environmental Award from the German Travel Association (DRV).

== Other names ==
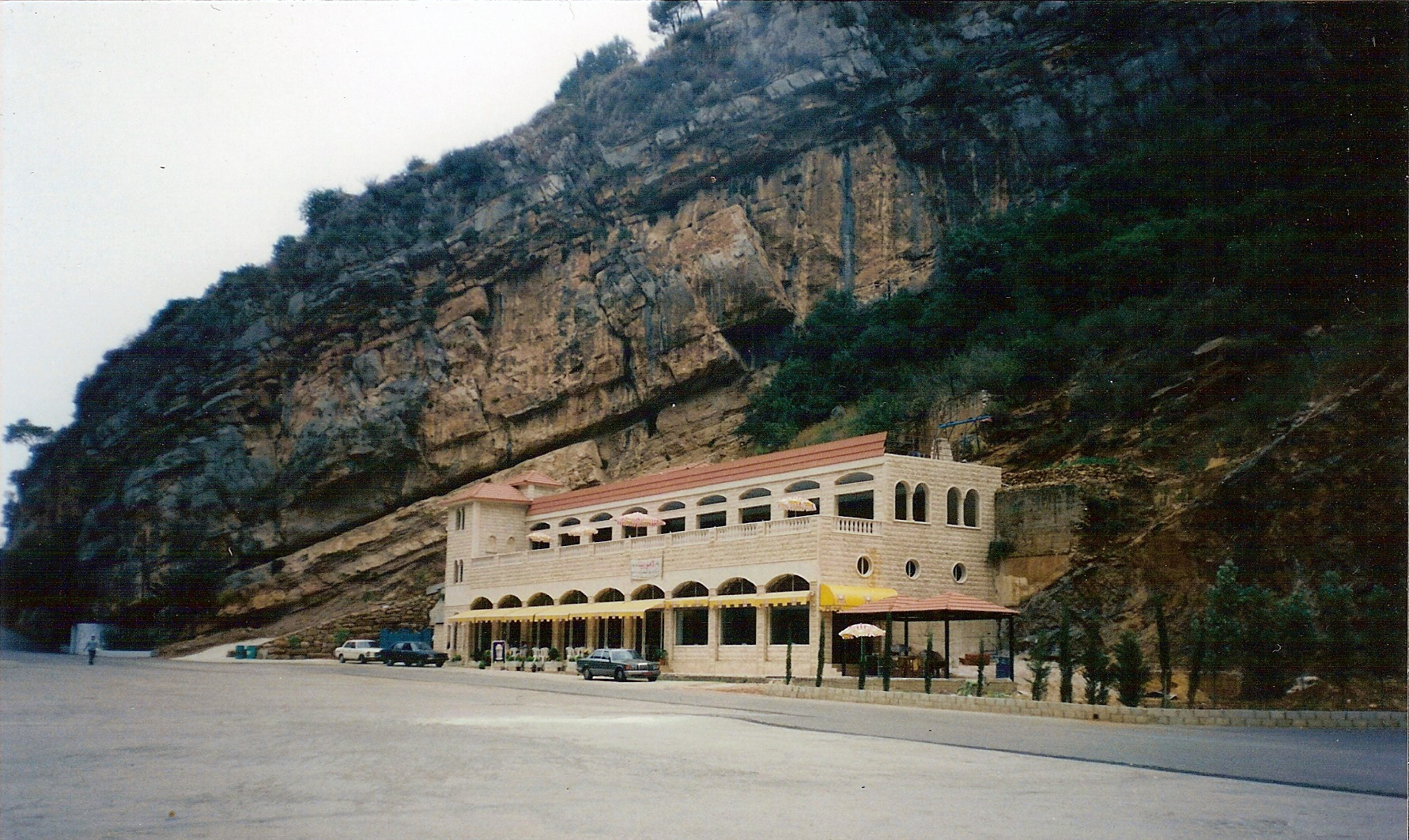
Tourist facilities in the vicinity of the grotto

The name of the cave changed several times since its discovery. Initially referred to as the Grottos of Nahr al-Kalb, it was subsequently known as Djaita, Jehita, and finally Jeita. Nahr al-Kalb is the name of the river that runs through the grottoes, while Jeita, meaning "roaring water" in Aramaic, is the town in which the cave's entrance is located. The transition from Grottoes of Nahr al-Kalb to Jeita Grottoes occurred in 1927 as newspapers widely used the latter name.

== Numismatics and philately ==
In 1961, Jeita became a national symbol when Lebanese authorities issued a stamp featuring the lower cavern to promote national tourism. Mr. Maroun Hajj, the oarsman shown on the stamp, still leads boat tours forty years after the stamp was issued. The Jeita Grotto is also featured on the 1964 one Lira (Lebanese pound) verso.

== Popular culture ==
Several scenes of the 1977 Hindi film Chandi Sona (starring Sanjay Khan and Parveen Babi) were shot at the site.

== See also ==
- List of Lebanese monuments
