= Antoine-Alphonse Montfort =

French painter

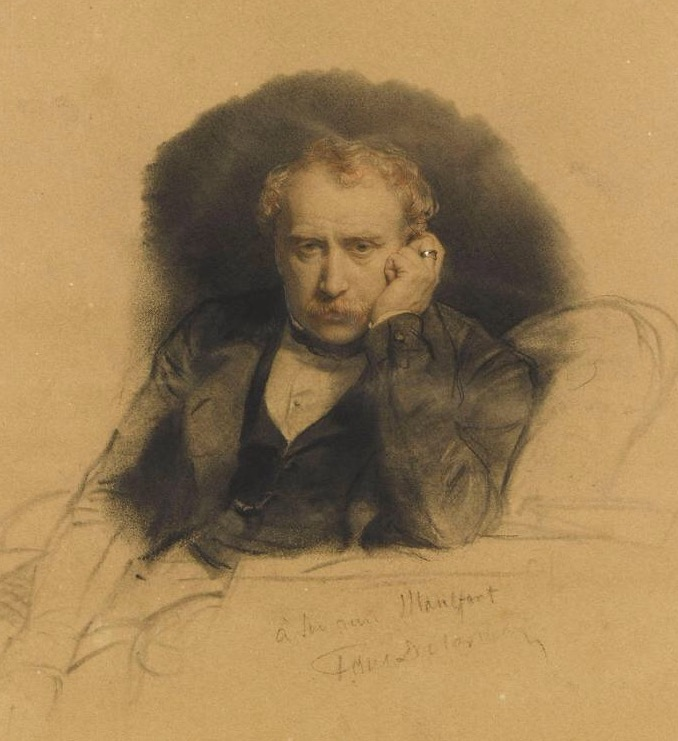
Antoine-Alphonse Montfort; portrait by Paul Delaroche

Antoine-Alphonse Montfort (3 April 1802 – 28 September 1884) was a French painter, best known for his Orientalist landscapes and genre scenes.

== Biography ==
He was born in Paris. In 1816, he became a pupil of Horace Vernet. After 1820, he was employed in the workshop of Antoine-Jean Gros. He also received advice from the painter Théodore Géricault.

From 1827 to 1828, under the auspices of Vernet, he became the ship's painter on the frigate La Victorieuse and sailed throughout the Mediterranean, visiting Corsica, Malta, the Greek islands, Istanbul, the coast of Syria and Egypt. Later, from 1837 to 1838, he participated in an expedition that visited Syria, Lebanon and Palestine. While there, he dressed as a native, travelled with caravans, lived in a tent and studied Arabic. He also kept a detailed travel diary that is now in the collection of the Bibliothèque Nationale de France. The sketches he made provided a source for paintings that lasted the rest of his life.

His first exhibition at the Salon came in 1835 and he would continue to exhibit there on a regular basis until 1881. For many years, he was a teacher at the École nationale supérieure des Beaux-Arts. The Louvre is in possession of 917 of his original drawings; donated by one of his nephews. All of his sketches and paintings are characterized by precise ethnographic detail and devoid of any romanticized or idealized representations.

Montfort died in Paris in 1884.

== Selected paintings ==
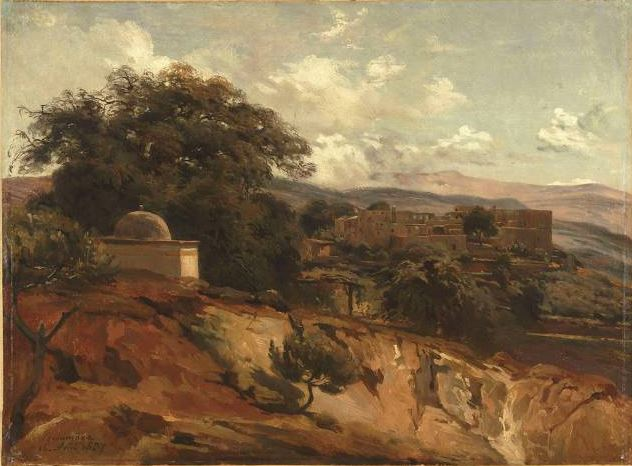
View of Brummana

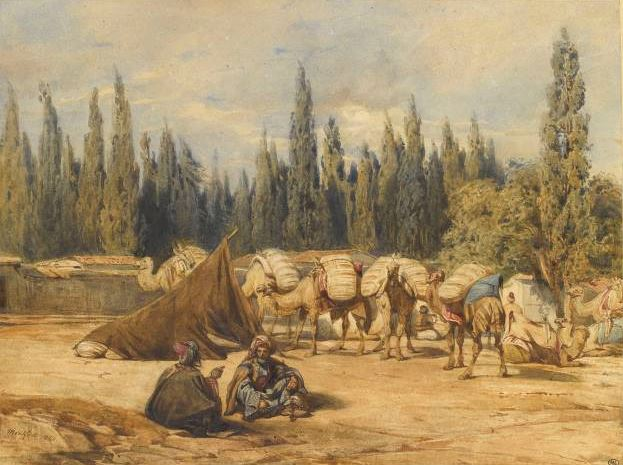
Resting Caravan

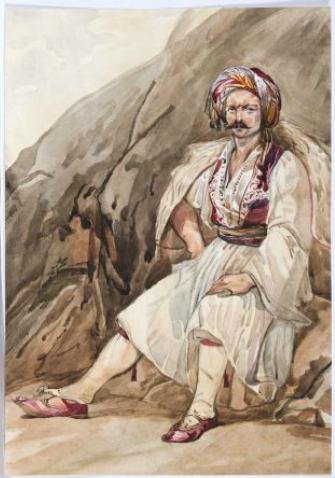
Greek Soldier

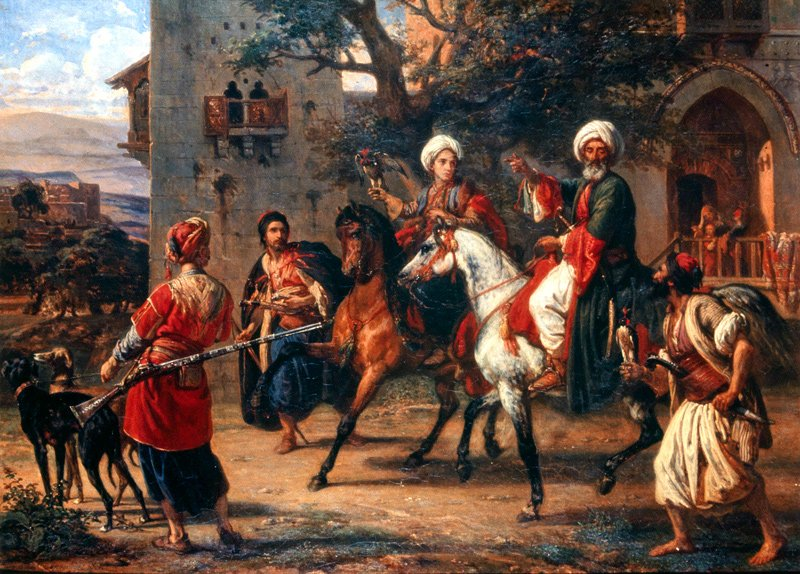
Departure on the Falcon Hunt
