= Our Lady of Nourieh =

Marian shrine in Hamat, Lebanon

Our Lady of Nourieh (Saydet el Nourieh in Arabic) is a Marian shrine in Hamat, Lebanon. Nourieh is a derivative of the Arabic word, nour, meaning light. Thus, in English, the Marian shrine can be called, Our Lady of Light.

The story of Our Lady of Light shrine and monastery is celebrated throughout Lebanon, a country where Christianity has existed since Jesus first evangelized in Tyre and Sidon, and therefore, Lebanon is often considered part of the “Holy Land.” Some of the first Christian communities were set up in Lebanon during the time of the apostles.

It is believed that two sailors built the shrine in the 4th century. One winter night, on a very stormy sea, the two sailors found themselves in peril. They began praying, and the Virgin appeared to them as a light and guided them gently to the shore of Theoprosopon near modern-day Chekka in North Lebanon. The grateful sailors carved a cave in the cliff and dedicated it to the Virgin Mary, and called the shrine, Our Lady of Light. A Greek Orthodox monastery was built in the 17th century. The miraculous icon of the Theotokos has been venerated for centuries for having glowed with light to attract wayward ships.

The shrine is a popular Christian pilgrimage site in Lebanon, and tourists and pilgrims alike enjoy the beautiful view of the bay from atop historic Cape Theoprosopon.
