= Batroun =

City in Lebanon

Batroun بترون Botrys
- City
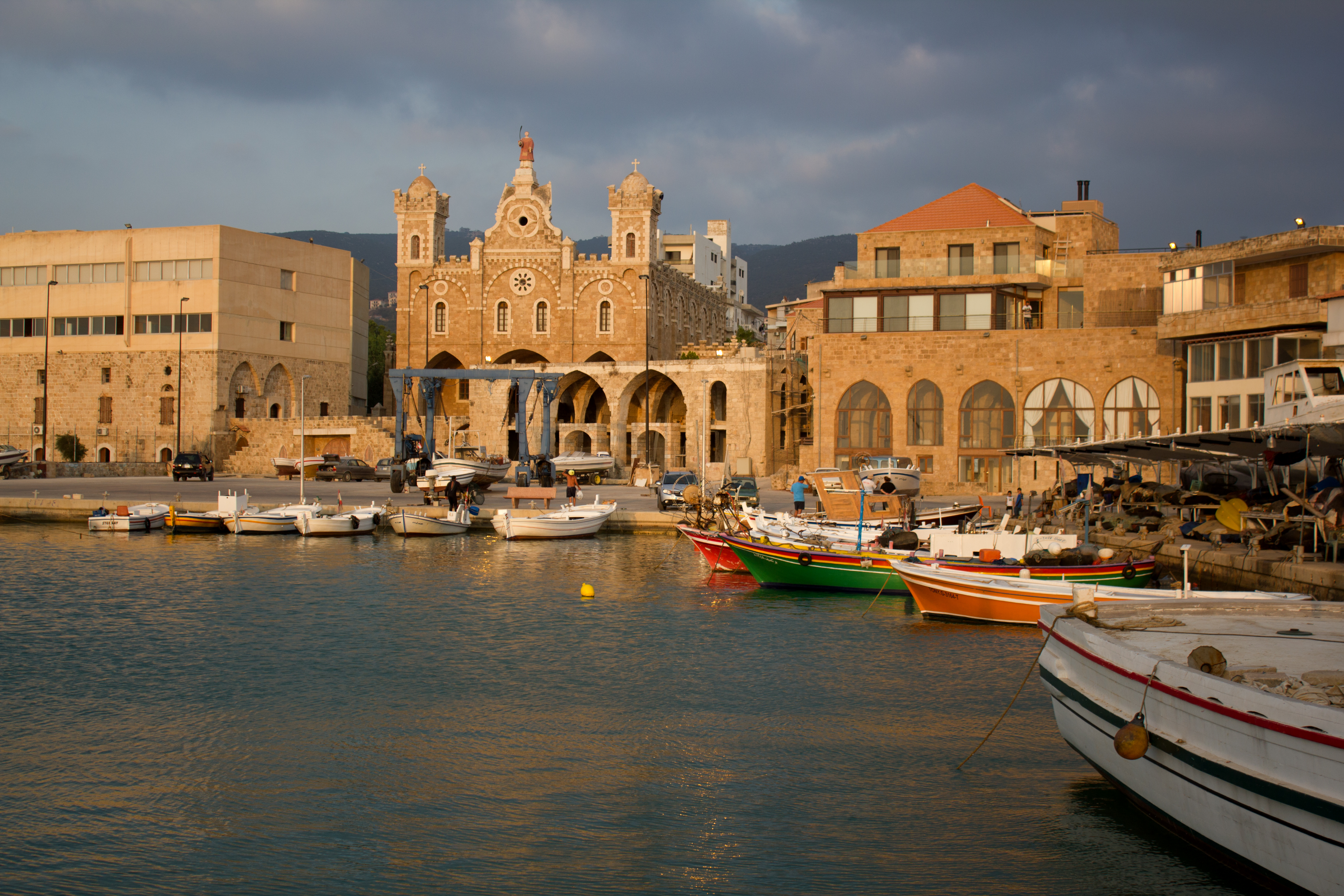
- The port at the old city of Batroun with the St. Stephens Church

- Location of Batroun within Lebanon
- Coordinates: 34°15′0″N 35°39′0″E
- Country: Lebanon
- Governorate: North Governorate
- District: Batroun District

Government
  - Mayor: Marcelino Al Hark
- Elevation: 34 m (112 ft)

Population
  - Total: 45,000
- Time zone: UTC+2 (EET)
  - Summer (DST): UTC+3 (EEST)
- Dialing code: +961 (6) Landline
- Patron Saint: Saint Stephen

Batroun (Arabic: بَتْرُون Batrūn;, ancient Botrys (Ancient Greek: Βότρυς, romanized: Bótrys), is a coastal city in northern Lebanon and one of the oldest continuously inhabited cities in the world. It is the capital city of Batroun District.

== Etymology ==
Batroun appears in Western Aramaic, and is attested in as bṯrwn (Arabic: بثرون) in premodern Arabic texts, with the expected lenition of t for an Aramaic term. Elie Mardini suggests the shift of the th to t in Aramaic terms in the Levant is due to the merger of certain fricatives in Levantine Arabic.

== History ==
Batroun is likely the "Batruna" mentioned in the Amarna letters (EA 078, EA 079, EA 081, EA 087, EA 088, EA 090, EA 093, EA 095, EA 124, EA 129), dating to the 14th century B.C. Batroun was mentioned by the ancient geographers Strabo, Pliny, Ptolemy, Stephanus of Byzantium, and Hierocles. Theophanes the Confessor called the city "Bostrys."

The Phoenicians founded Batroun on the southern side of the promontory called in classical antiquity Theoprosopon and during the Byzantine Empire, Cape Lithoprosopon. Batroun is said to have been founded by Ithobaal I (Ethbaal), king of Tyre (whose daughter Jezabel married Ahab).

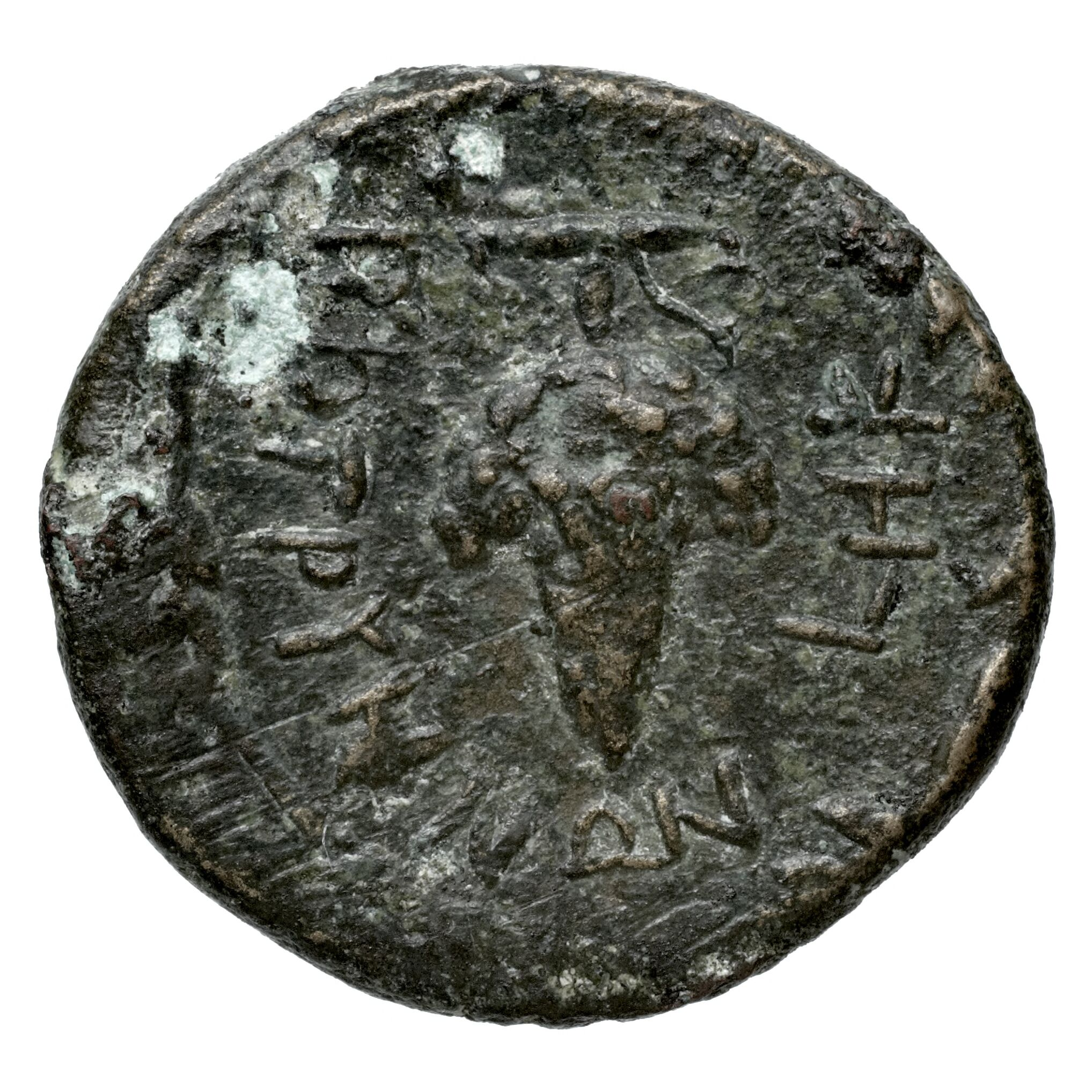
An autonomous coin of Botrys, 2 BC

During the Fourth Syrian War, the Seleucid king Antiochus III invaded territory controlled by Ptolemaic Kingdom and marched south along the eastern Mediterranean coast, capturing several cities along the way, including Botrys, as he advanced into the region known as Coele-Syria.

The city was under Roman rule to Phoenice Province, and later after the region was Christianized became a suffragan of the Patriarch of Antioch.

In 551, Batroun was destroyed by an earthquake, which also caused mudslides and made the Cape Lithoprosopon crack. Historians believe that Batroun's large natural harbor was formed during the earthquake.

Three Greek Orthodox bishops are known to have come from Batroun: Porphyrius in 451, Elias about 512 and Stephen in 553 (Lequien, II, 827). According to a Greek Notitia episcopatuum, the Greek Orthodox See has existed in Batroun since the tenth century when the city was then called Petrounion. After the Muslim conquests of the region, the name was Arabicized to Batroun.

Batroun was controlled by the Crusaders in 1104, to be known as the Lordship of Botrun as part of the County of Tripoli, until it was conquered by the Mamluk Sultanate in 1289. One of Batroun's archaeological sites is Mseilha Fort, which is constructed on an isolated massive rock with steep sides protruding in the middle of a plain surrounded by mountains.

Under Ottoman rule, Batroun was the centre of a kaza in the mutessariflik of Lebanon and the seat of a Maronite diocese, suffragan to the Maronite Catholic Patriarchate of Antioch. Since 1999, it has been the seat of the Maronite eparchy.

== Economy and urban development ==
Historically, the city of Batroun was settled at the interface between the sea and the national road that connected Beirut to Tripoli.

Lately, the radical shift of the historical functions of the local economic tissue into a leisure service-based economy (nightclubs, bars, restaurants, stores, etc.) has become the unique and only lever of the development of the city. The economic metamorphosis has resulted in the resettlement of housing towards emerging city suburbs (nearby hills: New Batroun, Batroun Hills, Basbina, etc.) consequently to the overvaluation of the real estate market in the city centre. It clearly reveals here the constitution of a business city-centre (dedicated to leisure and business) balanced by the constitution of residential suburbs, where accelerated urban sprawl has led to the destruction of natural lands (pinewood and orange groves) and to the fatal rise in land prices.

== Tourism ==
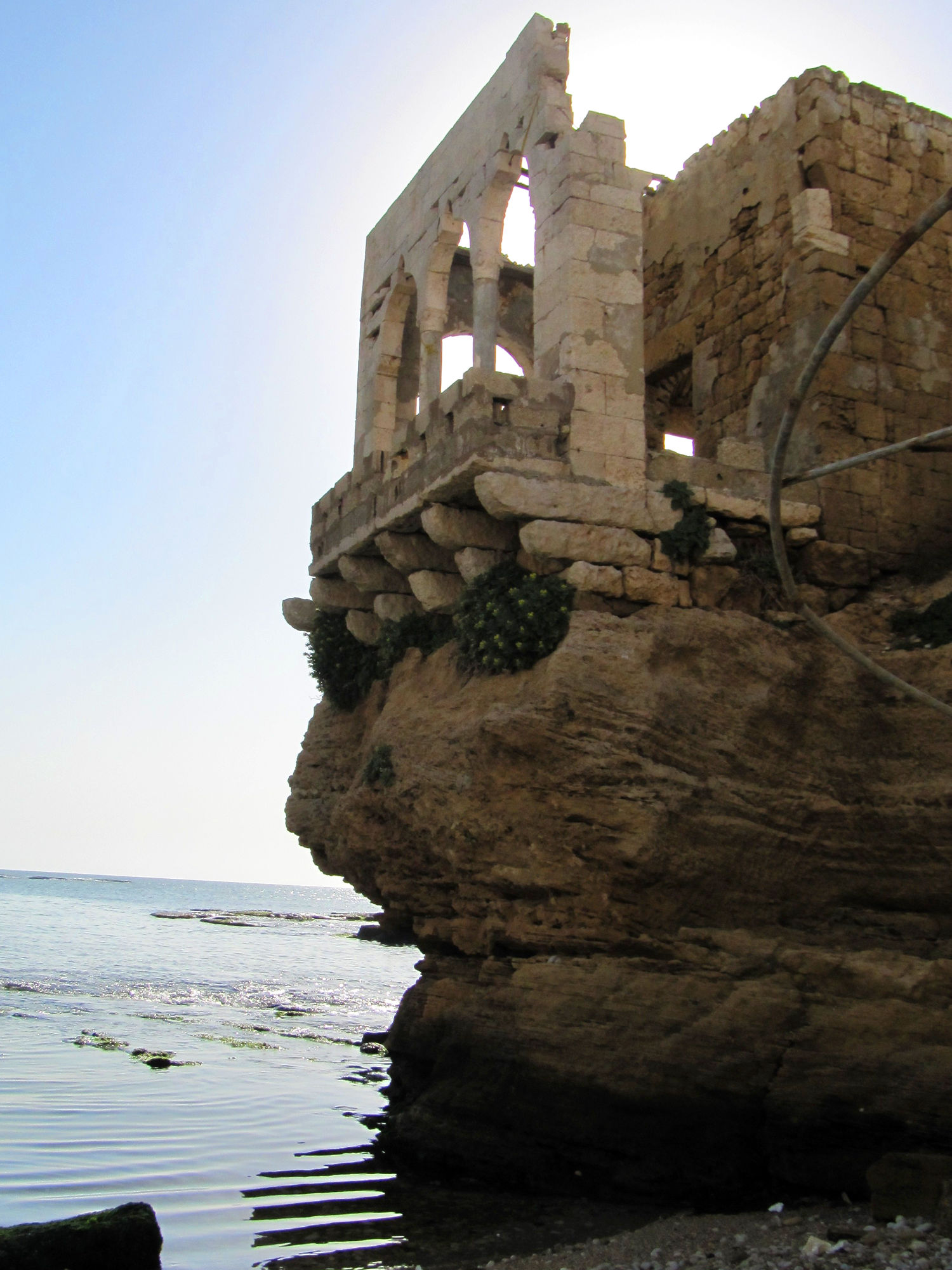
"Makaad El Mir" ruins by the rocky beach in Batroun, Lebanon

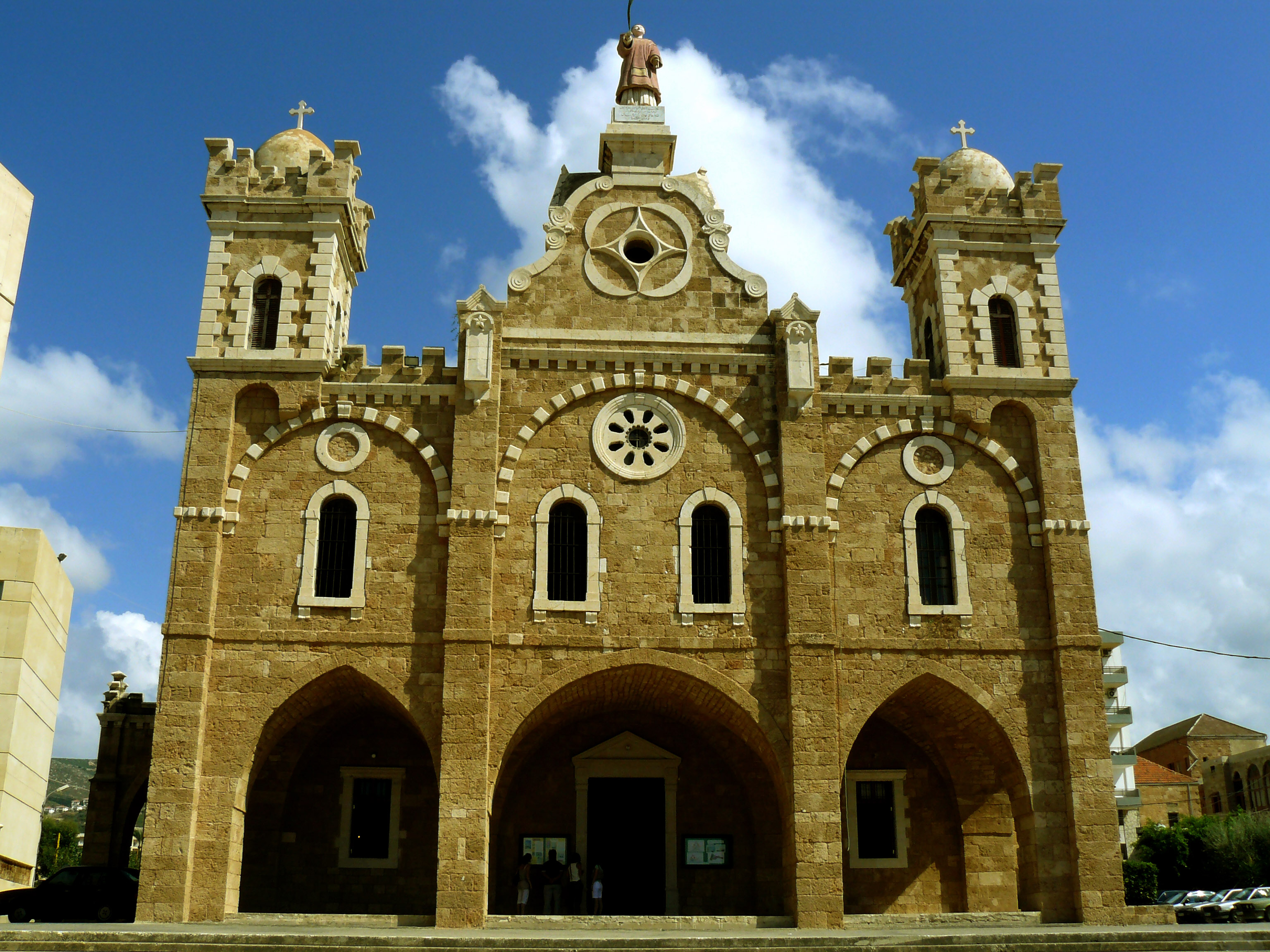
St. Stephen's Church

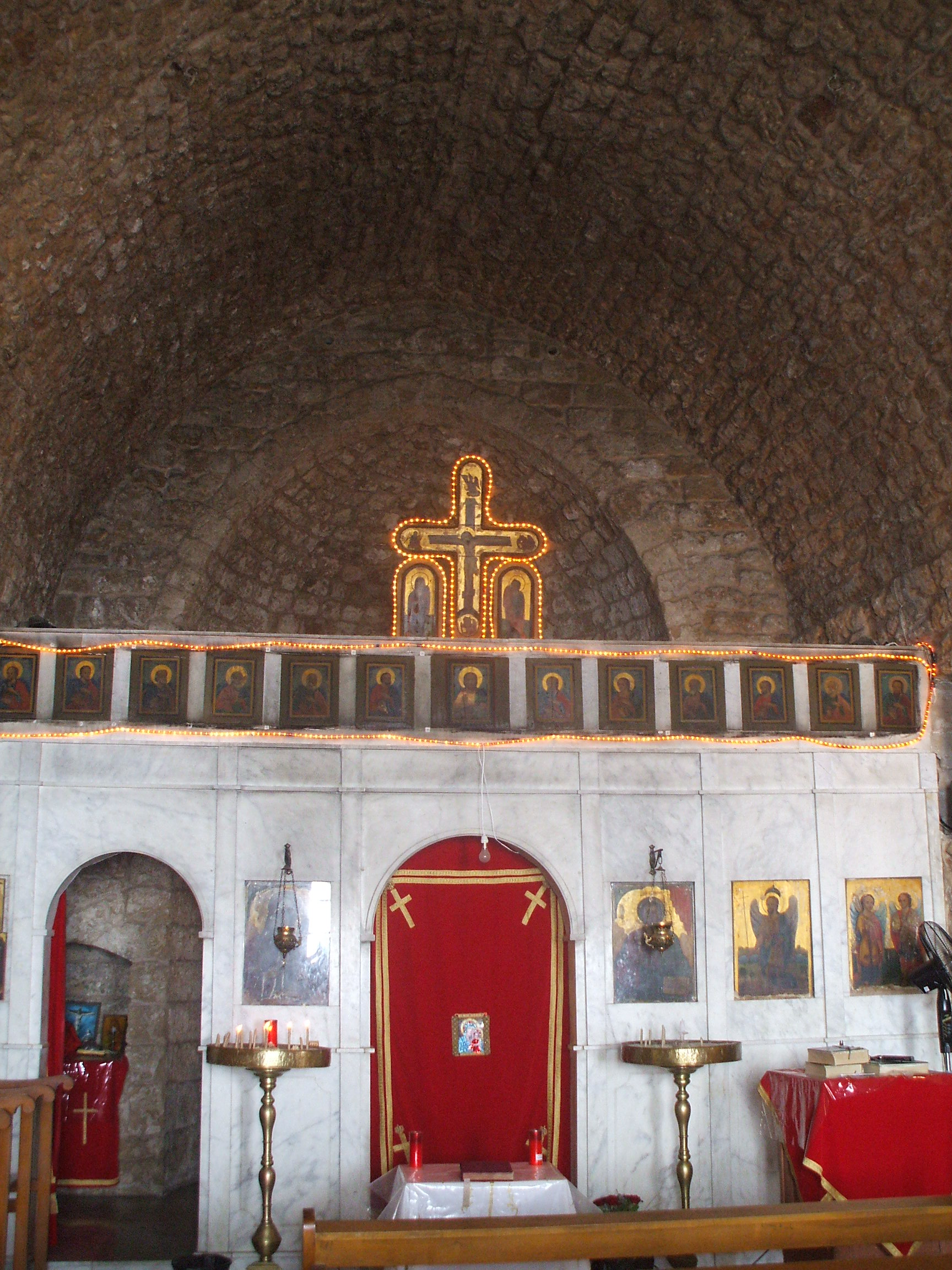
Our Lady of the Seas

Batroun is a major tourist destination in North Lebanon. The town boasts historic Maronite and Greek Orthodox churches. The town is also a major beach resort with a vibrant nightlife that includes pubs and nightclubs. Citrus groves surround Batroun, and the town has been famous (from the early 20th century) for its fresh lemonade sold at the cafés and restaurants on its main street. Biking along the Batroun coastline is also a major activity mainly in late summer days.

In 2009, the Batroun International Festival was born. It began hosting leading local and international artists. The festival takes place usually in July and/or August of each year in the old harbor area.

== Demographics ==
In 2014, Christians made up 89.69% and Muslims made up 9.80% of registered voters in Batroun. 64.16% of the voters were Maronite Catholics, 16.44% were Greek Orthodox and 7.97% were Sunni Muslims.

The people of Batroun are mainly Maronite, Melkite, and Greek Orthodox Christians. Batroun is a titular see in the Latin Church of the Catholic Church.

== Politics ==
Recent years have seen municipal and parliamentary elections become a growing factor and interest in Batroun. This is mainly in the context of local and national struggle for power. The current serving Mayor of Batroun is Marcelino El Harek.

== Landmarks ==
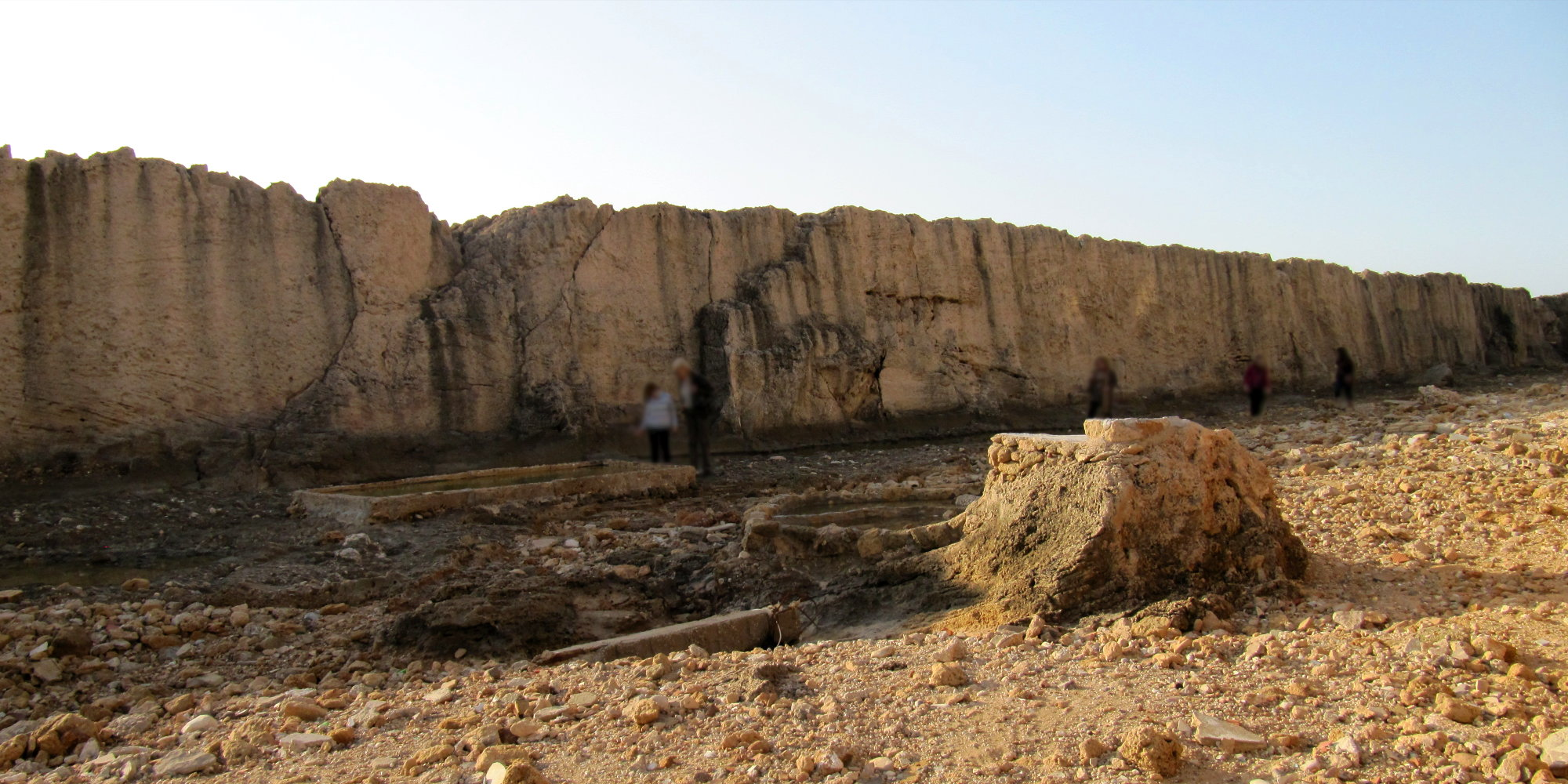
Ancient Phoenician wall built for protection from tidal waves

- Phoenician Sea Wall
- El-Bahsa beach
- Makaad El Mir
- Mseilha Fort
- St. Stephan's Cathedral, built in 1896
- Historic Souk
- Notre Dame de la Mer

== See also ==
- List of Crusader castles
- List of Lebanese monuments
