= Ras ash-Shaq'a =

Promontory in north Lebanon

Ras ash-Shaqʿa Arabic: رأس الشقعة Theoprosopon, Lithoprosopon
- Promontory
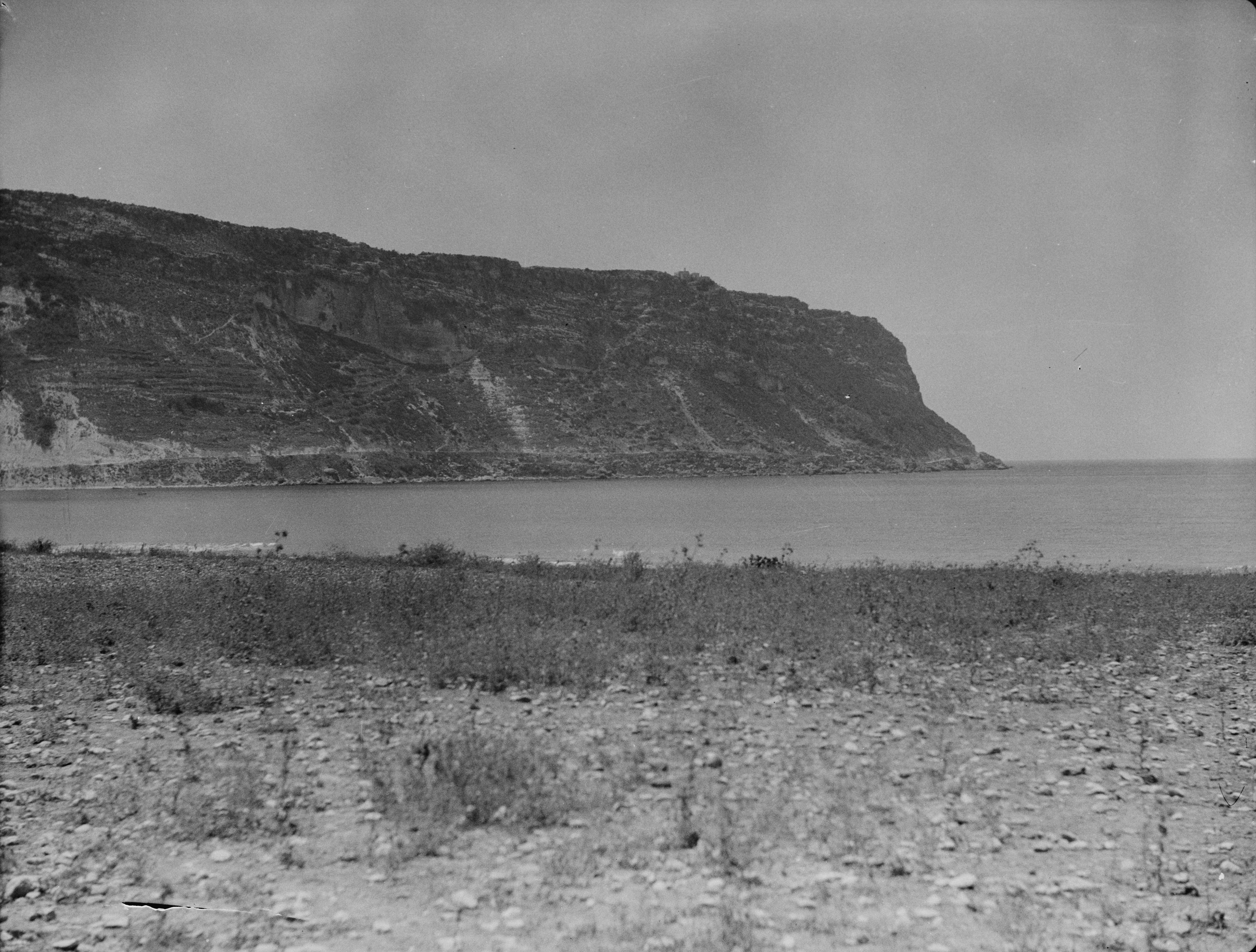
- 1920 picture of Ras ash-Shaq'a, taken from the coast of al-Heri

- Location of Ras ash-Shaq'a in Lebanon
- Coordinates: 34°18′45″N 35°41′15″E

Ramsar Wetland
- Official name: Deir el Nouriyeh cliffs of Ras Chekaa
- Designated: 16 April 1999
- Reference no.: 979

Ras ash-Shaq'a (Arabic: رأس الشقعة, romanized: Raʾs ash-Shaqʿa, alternative spelling Râs ach-Chaq’a’) is a promontory in north Lebanon, known in antiquity as Theoprosopon and Lithoprosopon. The promontory is situated between the ancient cities of Batroun and Tripoli; it creates a massive barrier that cuts through the coast of Lebanon, making it historically difficult for travelers to circumvent. Today's modern, coastal highway runs through the mass via two tunnels.

== History ==
During Antiquity, a road that ran parallel to the sea existed, which made it possible to circumvent Cape Lithoprosopon and to connect Batroun to Tripoli. Historians report that the earthquake of 551 A.D. caused a landslide, causing the road to sink into the sea permanently, and thus isolating Tripoli from Batroun and Byblos.

The name of the cape changed throughout history. The earliest known reference to the promontory appears in the Greek Periplus attributed to Pseudo-Scylax, where it is called "Theou Prosopon" (Θεοῦ πρόσωπον), meaning "Face of God". Later ancient authors also used this name, sometimes writing it as a single word, "Theuprosopon".

The name, Lithoprosopon, did not come to usage until the time of the Byzantine Empire when the area was completely Christianized and the name of the cape was changed from “Face of God”, to Lithoprosopon or “Face of Stone.” Aramaic and Syriac historians translated it to “Parsuph Kipa” and later on Arab historians translated it to “Anf Al-Hajar” and “Wajh Al-Hajar" or “Nose or Face of Stone.” The historians of the Crusades called it Puy du Connétable “Pew of the Constable” and “Mount of the General.” At the times of the Mamluks and Ottomans, the cape's named reverted to its Arabic name of “Wajh Al-Hajar.”

The French historian, Laurent d'Arvieux, wrote in 1660 that the Franks named it Cape Rouge, a corruption of the Lebanese Arabic word wež, which means “face.” Jean de La Roque, in 1688, gave the cape two additional names, Capo Pagro and Cappouge. Cappouge was probably a corruption of "Cap Rouge". Cappouge could also come from “Capo poggio” or “Cape of the Hill or of the Monticule”, which matches the current name of the cape, Râs ech-Chaq'a', which means “Cape of the Stone Monticule.” The stone monticule probably referred to the Greek Orthodox monastery of Our Lady of the Light that was built at that time.

== Modern tourist attraction ==
The cape today is home to several seaside resorts. It is also a popular Christian pilgrimage site where believers visit the shrine and monastery of Our Lady of Nourieh, located in the village of Hamat.

== Wetlands ==
There is a wetland refuge at the Deir el Nouriyeh cliffs of Ras as-Shaq'a, listed in the list of wetlands of international importance under the Ramsar Convention.
