= Xerxes =

Xerxes (/ˈzɜːrksiːz/ ZURK-seez) may refer to:

== People ==
- Xerxes I of Persia, "Xerxes the Great", reigned 486–465 BC
- Xerxes II of Persia, briefly reigned 424 BC
- Xerxes of Sophene, ruler of Sophene and Commagene, 228–201 BC
- Xerxes (Sasanian prince), 6th-century prince and general
- Xerxes (name), a list of people with the name

== Fiction, stage and video ==
- Il Xerse (Xerxès in its 1660 French version), a 1654 opera by Francesco Cavalli
- Xerse (Bononcini), a 1694 opera by Giovanni Bononcini
- Serse (Xerxes), a 1738 opera by George Frideric Handel
- Xerxes, a 1919 novel by Louis Couperus
- Xerxes (TV series), a 1988 Swedish TV series about young adults
- Xerxes (graphic novel), a 2018 graphic novel by Frank Miller

== Other ==
- Xerxes Peak, a mountain in the Canadian Rockies
- XerxesDZB, a Dutch formerly professional football team based in Rotterdam
- Roksan Xerxes, a series of record turntables from Roksan Audio (UK)
- XerXeS, a denial-of-service attack tool developed by The Jester
- XERXES, a computer AI in System Shock 2
- Xerxes, a 1994 album by Arcwelder
- Xerxes (plant), a genus of flowering plants in the aster family

== See also ==
- Ahasuerus, a related name used in the Hebrew Bible, legends and Apocrypha
- Artaxerxes I of Persia, reigned 465–424 BC
- Xerces (disambiguation)
