= Battle of Thannuris =

Battle fought in 528, near Dara in Mesopotamia

- Part of the Iberian War
- Map of the Byzantine-Persian frontier
Date	Summer 528 AD
Location	Thannuris, near Dara (modern Tell Tuneinir, Syria) 36.421406°N 40.866213°E
Result	Sasanian victory

Belligerents
Byzantine Empire; Ghassanids; Isaurians	Sasanian Empire

Commanders and leaders
Belisarius; Bouzes; Coutzes (POW); Proclianus †; Basil (POW); Sebastian (POW); Vincentius; Jabalah IV ibn al-Harith †	Xerxes; Perozes

Strength
Presumably larger than the Sasanian force	30,000

The Battle of Thannuris (Tannuris) was fought between the forces of the Byzantine Empire and the Persian Sasanian Empire in summer 528, near Dara in the northern region of Mesopotamia during the Iberian War.

The Byzantine emperor Justinian I, soon after coming to power, sought to strengthen the eastern frontier against the Persians with the construction of a fortress at Thannuris near Dara. The Persians viewed this as a threat and threatened to invade if the construction took place. In response, Justinian reinforced the location with additional troops to protect the construction. A Persian army under Peroz Mihran and Xerxes invaded and faced an outnumbered Byzantine army at Thannuris. The Persians feigned a retreat with the Byzantines pursuing them, confident in their numerical advantage. The Persians drove the pursuing Byzantine cavalry into concealed ditches, causing heavy losses. The surviving Byzantine cavalry escaped to Dara, while the infantry was captured or killed. The Persians destroyed the fortress under construction at Thannuris. Although Justinian reinforced the eastern defenses, a heavy winter prevented further engagements.

== Background ==
After the death of Emperor Justin I in 527, his successor Justinian I was determined to continue the war against the Sassanid (Persian) Empire. He appointed Belisarius as dux of Mesopotamia and put him in charge of strengthening the Byzantine positions and building a new fortress near Dara to protect the region from Persian raids. Thannuris appeared to be a convenient place for a city and a military force to be stationed, but the current fort was vulnerable. He began to oversee the construction.

The Persians considered all the frontier forts, whether major or minor, as a threat. They threatened to invade if the construction was not stopped. Justinian responded by reinforcing Belisarius with the duces of Phoenice Libanensis Coutzes and Bouzes, the dux of Phoenicia Proclianus (according to John Malalas), Sebastianus, Vincentius, comes Basilius, some Isaurians, and Ghassanid Arabs under their king Jabalah IV ibn al-Harith (Tapharas). Syvänne estimates the infantry at least 10,000 and the cavalry at 30,000. He argues that the combined Byzantine army must have been superior in numbers, but the fact that Belisarius was only a dux limited his authority over other duces. At the same time, a Persian army under Peroz Mihran and prince Xerxes invaded Mesopotamia with 30,000 men to prevent the construction of the fortress.

== Battle ==
According to contemporary historian Zacharias of Mytilene, the battle took place near Thannuris as follows. The advancement of the Persian army near the construction of the fort led to a halt, prompting the Byzantines to assemble their forces. Mihran employed a double stratagem. Mihran first advanced toward Mindouos to provoke the Byzantines, who were confident in their numerical superiority, and then feigned a retreat by withdrawing toward Thannuris, where he had prepared an ambush. The Persians concealed ditches behind their lines and left openings for a controlled retreat. Their cavalry then feigned flight, enticing the Byzantine cavalry into pursuit. The same stratagem was used by Hephthalites against the Persian shah Peroz during the war of 484.

The Byzantine commanders Coutzes and Bouzes took the bait and led the charge. They were followed by the rest of the cavalry, which charged directly into the concealed pits. As a result, the Byzantines suffered heavy losses. Jabalah IV ibn al-Harith, who fought under Belisarius's command as a Byzantine vassal, fell from his horse and was killed by the Persians. Coutzes's fate is uncertain. Contemporary historian Procopius writes that he was taken prisoner and never seen again, while Zacharias records that he was killed. Proclianus was killed in action. Sebastian and Basil were both captured.

Belisarius and the surviving Byzantine cavalry escaped to Dara, while most of the infantry was killed or captured. According to historian Ilkka Syvänne, the failure of the infantry to conduct a fighting retreat suggests both low morale and a significant Persian cavalry advantage. Moreover, the Isaurian infantry's equipment was also poorly suited to fighting cavalry. (Note: Historian Ilkka Syvänne notes that earlier Byzantine infantry had demonstrated that disciplined troops armed with pila could successfully resist cavalry.) The defeat weakened the Byzantine army along the eastern frontier.

== Aftermath ==
=== Battle of Mindouos ===
Following the defeat at Thannuris, Justinian ordered Belisarius to construct a fort at Mindouos (Note: Also spelled as Minduon or Minduous.) (also known as Melebasa, modern Öğündük), north of Nisibis. However, Belisarius was defeated at the hill of Mindouos. Despite the defeat, Belisarius was promoted to magister militum per orientem in 529. Historian Ian Hughes suggests that Belisarius was not held responsible for the defeats. As dux, he lacked sufficient authority over the other duces, and it is plausible that he opposed the pursuit from Mindouos to Thannuris but was overruled by his subordinates.

=== Campaign ===
After the battle, the Persians destroyed the incomplete fortress. Despite their victory, the Persians suffered heavy losses and then retreated behind the frontier. The Byzantine emperor Justinian sent additional troops to reinforce the border fortresses. He also raised a new army which was placed under the command of Pompeius (nephew of Emperor Anastasius). However, no engagements took place because of a severe winter that interrupted further operations until the end of the year.

== Scholarly assessment ==
The exact course of the Persian campaign is poorly recorded in the primary sources. According to Hughes, Procopius compresses the battles at Thannuris and Mindouos into a single encounter. Historian Chris Lillington-Martin argues that Procopius sought to diminish the impact of Belisarius's defeat by placing the event immediately before his subsequent victory at Dara.
