= Domnentiolus =

Domnentiolus (Greek: Δομνεντίολος) was a Byzantine military officer, active in the reign of Justinian I (r. 527–565). He is better known for his service in Sicily during the Gothic War.

== Name ==
Primary sources are inconsistent in the rendering of his name. The spelling "Domnentiolus" derives from Procopius. Menander Protector names him "Domenentiolus" (Greek: Δομενεντίολος). John Malalas reports him as "Dometiolus", Theophanes the Confessor as "Domentziolus". Zacharias Rhetor names him "Domitziolus". A fragment of Theophanes of Byzantium, preserved by Patriarch Photios, calls him "Comentiolus".

== Biography ==
Domnentiolus was born to an unnamed sister of Bouzes. The relation is reported by both Zacharias Rhetor and Procopius. His other maternal uncles included Coutzes and Venilus. His maternal grandfather was probably the general and rebel Vitalian.

Domnentiolus is first mentioned in April, 531, at about the time of the Battle of Callinicum. The Iberian War was still ongoing. His uncle Bouzes was stationed at Amida, an illness preventing him from campaigning. He tasked Domnentiolus with leading an army to Abhgarsat. This location is only mentioned once by Zacharias. The Byzantine forces faced the Sassanid army and were defeated. Domnentiolus himself was captured by his enemies and transported to the interior of the Sassanid Empire. In 532, the Eternal Peace was concluded between the two powers. Domnentiolus was released "in an exchange of prisoners".

He resurfaces in 543 as one of the commanders of the Byzantine army in Lazic War. Domnentiolus, Justus, Peranius, John, son of Nicetas and John the Glutton led their combined forces to Phison, near Martyropolis, and from there to the Persian border. Procopius reports: "And Justus, the emperor's nephew, and Peranius and John, the son of Nicetas, together with Domentiolus and John, who was called the Glutton, made camp near the place called Phison, which is close by the boundaries of Martyropolis. Thus then were encamped the Roman commanders with their troops; and the whole army amounted to thirty thousand men. Now all these troops were neither gathered into one place, nor indeed was there any general meeting for conference. But the generals sent to each other some of their followers and began to make enquiries concerning the invasion."

Other Byzantine generals led an invasion into the Sassanid Empire from another location. Procopius continues: "Suddenly, however, Peter, without communicating with anyone, and without any careful consideration, invaded the hostile land with his troops. And when on the following day this was found out by Philemouth and Beros, the leaders of the Eruli, they straightway followed. And when this in turn came to the knowledge of Martin and Valerian and their men, they quickly joined in the invasion."

However, Justus decided against joining the others. Procopius reports on the movements of Justus, Domnentiolus and the others "And all of them a little later united with each other in the enemy's territory, with the exception of Justus and his men, who, as I have said, had encamped far away from the rest of the army, and learned later of their invasion; then, indeed, they also invaded the territory of the enemy as quickly as possible at the point where they were, but failed altogether to unite with the other commanders. As for the others, they proceeded in a body straight for Doubios, neither plundering nor damaging in any other way the land of the Persians."

Justus, Domnentiolus and the others led their forces to Taraunitis (Taron). They raided the area and then retreated. Procopius reports: "As for the forces of Justus and Peranius, they invaded the country about Taraunon, and after gathering some little plunder, immediately returned."

Domnentiolus is next mentioned in 550, during the Gothic War. He was at the time the military commander of Messana in Sicily. When Totila led the Ostrogoths in an invasion of Sicily, Messana came under attack. Domnentiolus led his forces in meeting the enemy outside the walls of the city. He defeated them on the battlefield and stopped their advance. But then retreated within the walls of Messana and concentrated on the defense of the city. Procopius notes that the countryside was left unprotected. This is the last chronological mention of Domnentiolus.

== Sources ==
- Martindale, John R.; Jones, A.H.M.; Morris, John (1992), The Prosopography of the Later Roman Empire, Volume III: AD 527–641, Cambridge University Press, ISBN 0-521-20160-8
- Procopius of Caesarea; Dewing, Henry Bronson (1914), History of the wars. vol. 1, Books I-II, Cambridge University Press, ISBN 0-674-99054-4
