= Turgun =

Turgun (fl. 515) was a military officer who served in the Byzantine Empire and was of Hunnish descent.

== History ==
He was one of the officers in the army of Byzantine general Vitalian, who rebelled against Emperor Anastasius, going on two expeditions against Constantinople. His name is of Turkic origin.

He is said to have betrayed fellow Hun commander Tarrach, handing him over to Anastasius.
