= Xerces =

Xerces may refer to:

- Apache Xerces, a family of software packages for parsing and manipulating XML
- Xerces blue (Glaucopsyche xerces), an extinct butterfly
- The Xerces Society, an environmental organization that focuses on invertebrates
- "Xerces", a song by Deftones on the album Saturday Night Wrist
- Xerces I, the original French spelling of Xerxes I

== See also ==
- Xerxes (disambiguation), the English spelling of this name
