= Gaianus of Tyre =

Consularis Phoenices 362

Gaianus of Tyre (Greek: Γαϊανός ό Τύριος) was the consular governor of Phoenicia in 362. Pagan Hellene rhetorician Libanius' Epistulae with Gaianus lists his achievements after his graduation from the Law school of Berytus.

As a rule, Roman governors were chosen from provinces other that the ones they were appointed to; Libanius' epistula 799 relates that the Emperor made an exception to that rule and allowed Gaianus, a Tyrian, to rule over his home province of Phoenice.

== Bibliography ==
- Collinet, Paul (1869-1938) Auteur du texte (1925). Études historiques sur le droit de Justinien. 2, Histoire de l'école de droit de Beyrouth / par Paul Collinet,...
