= Marinus (praetorian prefect) =

Praetorian prefecture of the East
- In office Early 512 – Early 515
- Monarch: Anastasius I Dicorus
- Succeeded by: John the Paphlagonian
- In office 519–?
- Monarch: Justin I

Personal details
- Died: ~ 539 AD

Marinus (Greek: Μαρίνος) was one of the most trusted and senior aides of the Eastern Roman emperor Anastasius I (r. 491–518). He served twice as the praetorian prefect of the East, supervised some of Anastasius' tax reforms, supported the Emperor's pro-Monophysite policies and led the Roman navy in a crucial battle that ended the rebellion of general Vitalian in Thrace decisively. He survived into the regime of Justin I (r. 518–527), when he served his second tenure as the praetorian prefect, but was soon sidelined from power and died sometime before 539 AD.

== Biography ==
Marinus was a native of Apamea in Syria, and, like most Syrians, a Monophysite. Nothing is known of his early life, but in 498 he was appointed by Anastasius as the senior financial official (tractator, and later chartularius) of the fiscal department of the praetorian prefecture of the East responsible for the Diocese of Oriens, which encompassed his native Syria. He also seems to have been appointed to the post of logothete. His predecessor in the post, John the Paphlagonian, went on to supervise Anastasius' reform of Byzantine coinage. From this position, Marinus became one of the Emperor's chief financial advisers, especially on matters of taxation; he was also responsible for the institution of the vindices, officials tasked with collecting the annona tax, which hitherto had been the responsibility of the provincial city councils. The details of the reform are obscure, and contemporary opinion on its effects is divided: John Lydus, whose stance is hostile to Marinus, blames it for impoverishing the provinces, while a panegyric by Priscian claims that it was a great relief to the farmers. Although the new system seems to have been successful in increasing state revenue, it was extensively modified and ultimately mostly abandoned in subsequent reigns.

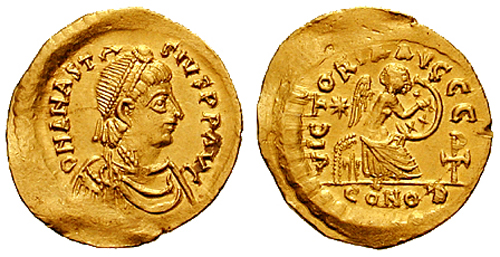
Semissis of Emperor Anastasius I (r. 491–518).

By the 500s, Marinus had emerged as "the most trusted adviser" of Anastasius (per historian John B. Bury), and was rewarded with a nomination to the praetorian prefectureship of the East, probably in early 512. He seems to have held the post until early 515. In autumn 512, Marinus encouraged Anastasius to openly support the Monophysite version of the Trisagion liturgical hymn, which the Patriarch Timothy had inserted into the liturgy even in the Hagia Sophia. As a result, the mostly Chalcedonian population of Constantinople launched a major riot on 4 November against the "heretical" version, forcing Marinus and Plato, the urban prefect, to respond with force in an attempt to quell the disturbance. The clashes continued, however, and on 6 November the Chalcedonian populace gathered in the Forum of Constantine and launched a riot that nearly cost Anastasius his throne: Anastasius's statues were thrown down, the aged general Areobindus, related by marriage to the Theodosian dynasty, was proclaimed emperor, and Marinus' house was torched. It took a personal appearance by Anastasius in the Hippodrome of Constantinople to calm the crowds, who demanded that Marinus and Plato be thrown to the beasts.

In 515, Marinus was entrusted by Anastasius with leading the campaign against Vitalian, the magister militum per Thracias (general for Thrace), who had rebelled against Anastasius' pro-Monophysite policies and was marching on the imperial capital Constantinople. This unusual appointment of a civilian official to command an army was due to the reluctance of the two generals commanding the imperial armies around Constantinople, Patricius and John, to confront Vitalian, whom they had known personally. Despite his lack of military experience, Marinus defeated the rebel fleet in a battle at the entrance of the Golden Horn. According to the account given by John Malalas, this was achieved through the use of a sulfur-based chemical substance invented by a certain Proclus of Athens (probably Proclus?), similar to the later Greek fire. Marinus then landed with his men on the shore of Sycae (modern Galata), near Bytharion (modern Tophane), and defeated the rebels he found there. Disheartened by the losses suffered, Vitalian and his army fled north to Anaplous under cover of night, retreating further to Anchialus.

Although he is recorded to have joined with the praepositus sacri cubiculi (chamberlain) Amantius in instigating disturbances in the Hagia Sophia shortly after the elevation of Justin I (r. 518–527) to the throne, Marinus managed to survive the transition to the new regime. He was named praetorian prefect for a second time in 519, and was even said to have decorated a public bath with scenes from the life of Justin, including his arrival in Constantinople as a poor peasant. He died sometime before 539. Of his family it is only known that he had a daughter, and that her son was named governor in Libya (either Marmarica or Cyrenaica), where he proved particularly rapacious.
