= Xerxes (name) =

Xerxes is a male name. It is the Greek version of the Old Persian name Xšaya-ṛšā, which is today known in Modern Persian as Khashayar.

Notable people with the name include:

== People ==
=== Ancient ===
- Xerxes I of Persia, reigned 486–465 BC
- Xerxes II of Persia, reigned 424 BC
- Xerxes of Sophene, ruler of Sophene and Commagene, 228–201 BC
- Xerxes (Sasanian prince), 6th-century prince and general

=== Modern ===
- Xerxes Desai (died 2016), Indian businessman
- Xerxes de Oliveira, Brazilian drum and bass producer also known as XRS, XRS Land, Friendtornik and Kapitel 06

== Fictional characters ==
- Xerxes, character in Disney's Aladdin
- XERXES, an Artificial intelligence in the video game System Shock 2
- Xerxes Khodaiji, the protagonist of the film Little Zizou
- Xerxes Break, a character in Pandora Hearts
- Xerxes, the primary antagonist in D-Yikes!, an episode of South Park
- Xerxes, character in Call Girl (Family Guy)
- Xerxes IX, a character in the game Neko Atsume
