= Coutzes =

Byzantine Military General

- Military career
- Allegiance: Byzantine Empire
- Branch: Byzantine army
- Rank: General
- Conflicts: Battle of Thannuris (Mindouos)

Coutzes or Cutzes (Greek: Κούτζης; fl. 528) was a general of the Byzantine Empire during the reign of Emperor Justinian I (r. 527–565).

== Biography ==
Coutzes appears in the sources in 528, as joint dux of Phoenice Libanensis together with his brother, Bouzes. The dual command had been instituted the year before by Emperor Justinian I (r. 527–565), and Coutzes led the troops stationed at Damascus, while his brother led the troops at Palmyra. The 6th-century historian Procopius described both brothers as being young at the time. Coutzes also had another brother, Benilus or Venilus, and was most probably the son of the general and rebel Vitalian.

In 528, a year after the outbreak of the Iberian War against Sassanid Persia, the two brothers were ordered, along with other commanders, to reinforce Belisarius (then dux Mesopotamiae) who was protecting the construction of a fort at Thannuris. When the Byzantines attacked a Persian army, however, they suffered a heavy defeat in the Battle of Thannuris. Coutzes's fate is uncertain; Procopius writes that he was taken prisoner and never seen again, while Zacharias of Mytilene records that he was killed.

== Sources ==
- Greatrex, Geoffrey; Lieu, Samuel N. C. (2002). The Roman Eastern Frontier and the Persian Wars (Part II, 363–630 AD). London, United Kingdom: Routledge. ISBN 0-415-14687-9.
- Martindale, John R., ed. (1992). The Prosopography of the Later Roman Empire: Volume III, AD 527–641. Cambridge: Cambridge University Press. ISBN 0-521-20160-8.
