= Tarrach =

Tarrach (died 515) was a Hun military officer for the East Roman Empire. He was the assassin of the officer Cyril. Tarrach was credited as the "fiercest of the Huns".

== Biography ==
Otto Maenchen-Helfen listed his name among those of undetermined origin. He noted that, if he was baptized, his original pagan name might have been assimilated to Tarachus, the name of one of the three martyrs of Cappadocia.

The general Vitalian employed him to assassinate Cyril. Cyril was an officer who had been appointed by the Emperor instead of the unpopular Hypatius. Cyril immediately marched to Lower Moesia, but Vitalian sent Tarrach, who successfully assassinated him.

In 515 Vitalian mobilized his army, with Tarrach as one of its officers, and marched towards Constantinople for a second time, but was defeated and retreated north with his troops. After the collapse of Vitalian's second rebellion, Tarrach was captured. Described as the "fiercest of the Huns", he was tortured and burned at the stake in Chalcedon.

== Sources ==
- Bury, John Bagnell (1958) [1923]. History of the Later Roman Empire: From the Death of Theodosius I to the Death of Justinian, Volume 1. Mineola, New York: Dover Publications. OCLC 41478187.
- Martindale, John R., ed. (1980). The Prosopography of the Later Roman Empire: Volume II, AD 395–527. Cambridge: Cambridge University Press. ISBN 0-521-20159-4.
