= Phoenice (Roman province) =

Roman/Byzantine province (c. 194–392)

Province of Syria Phoenice Provincia Syria Phoenice (Latin) ἐπαρχία τῆς Φοινίκης Συρίας (Koine Greek)
- Province of the Roman Empire
- c. 194–c. 392
- Roman Empire in 210 with Syria Phoenice highlighted in red
- Capital: Tyrus; Emesa (co-capital since 218–222)
- Historical era: Late Antiquity
  - Created by Septimius Severus: c. 194
  - Division during the reign of Theodosius the Great: c. 392
Preceded by	Succeeded by
Roman Syria; Syria Palaestina	Phoenice Libanensis; Phoenice Paralia
- Today part of: Lebanon; Syria; Israel

Phoenice (Latin: Syria Phoenīcē Latin: [ˈsʏri.a pʰoe̯ˈniːkeː]; Koine Greek: ἡ Φοινίκη Συρία, romanized: hē Phoinī́kē Syría Koine Greek: [(h)e pʰyˈni.ke syˈri.a]) was a province of the Roman Empire, encompassing the historical region of Phoenicia. It was officially created in 194 AD and after c. 392, Phoenice Syria was divided into Phoenice proper or Phoenice Paralia, and Phoenice Libanensis, a division that persisted until the region was conquered by the Rashidun caliphate in the 630s.

== Administrative history ==
=== Background ===
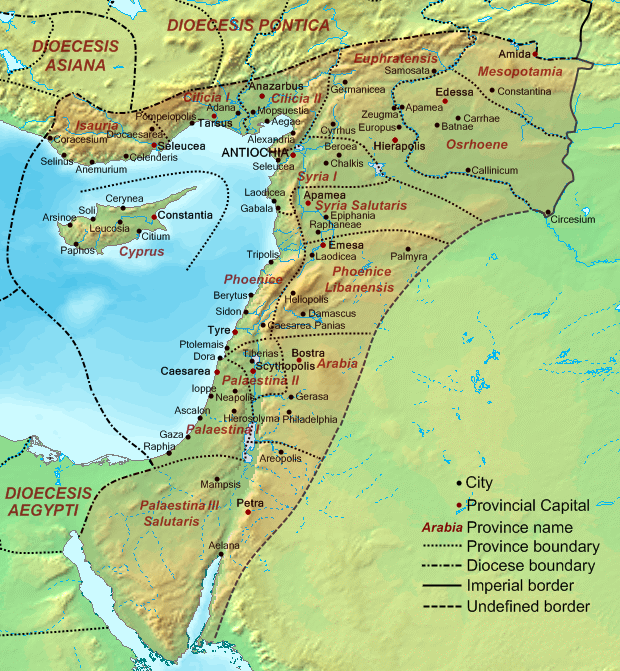
Map of the Diocese of the East with its provinces, as recorded in the Notitia Dignitatum, c. 400

Phoenicia came under Roman rule in 64 BC, when Pompey created the province of Syria. With the exception of a brief period in 36–30 BC, when Mark Antony gave the region to Ptolemaic Egypt, Phoenicia remained part of the province of Syria thereafter. Emperor Hadrian (reigned 117–138) is said to have considered a division of the overly large Syrian province in 123–124 AD.

=== Creation ===
It was not until shortly after c. 194 AD that Septimius Severus (r. 193–211) actually undertook this, dividing the province into Syria Coele in the north and Syria Phoenice in the south. The province was much larger than the area traditionally called Phoenicia: for example, cities like Emesa (Note: Modern-day Homs/Hims (حمص), Syria.) and Palmyra (Note: Arabic: تَدْمُر (Tadmur)) and the base of the Legio III Gallica (Note: A military unit of the Imperial Roman army) in Raphanaea (Note: Arabic: الرفنية, romanized: al-Rafaniyya; colloquial: Rafniye) were now subject to the governor who resided in Tyre. Veterans of this military unit were settled in Tyre, which also received the rank of colonia.

After the death of the 2nd century Roman emperor Commodus, a civil war erupted, in which Berytus, and Sidon supported Pescennius Niger. While the city of Tyre supported Septimius Severus, which led Niger to send Mauri (Note: Latin designation for the Berber population of Mauretania, a region in the ancient Maghreb.) javelin men and archers to sack the city. However, Niger lost the civil war, and Septimius Severus decided to show his gratitude for Tyre's support by making it the capital of Phoenice. Berytus was permitted to maintain its status as a Roman colony but lost the territory of Heliopolis, which was established as a separate colony. Ulpian, a native of Tyre, states that the grant of colonial status to Heliopolis resulted from this civil war. Elagabalus (r. 218–222) later raised his native Emesa to co-capital, and the two cities rivalled each other as the head of the province until its division in the 4th century. However, Elagabalus is recognized for bestowing imperial favor on Berytus, along with other cities in the region.

==== Phoenician revival ====
Septimius Severus revitalized Phoenician identity through the establishment of Phoenice. This revival of an ancient regional name seems to have stemmed from his pride in his origins in the region of Dido in North Africa and his wife’s ancestral ties to historic Phoenicia. This deliberate invocation of the legendary connection between Tyre and Carthage, celebrated in the Aeneid, was reflected in several significant projects.

During the early third century, Septimius Severus and his successors undertook extensive construction in the coastal cities of Phoenicia as well as in various Punic cities in North Africa. Notably, Lepcis Magna, his birthplace, was richly adorned and linked to the city of Tyre through coins and inscriptions. The Severan dynasty actively promoted the Phoenician-Roman connection by glorifying the Aeneid and its characters.

For instance, coins from Tyre during this period depict Dido overseeing the founding of Carthage, and one inscription from Lepcis Magna dedicated to Geta honored 'SEPTIMIA TYROS COLONIA METROPOLIS PHOENICES ET ALIARUM CIVITATUM' (‘Tyre the Septimian colony, mother-city of Phoenicia and of other cities.’). These efforts not only served to elevate his imperial authority and family heritage but also bolstered Phoenician identity in the newly formed province of Phoenice.

== Governors ==
Achillius I was referred to as the hegemon of Phoenice in a letter written to introduce Theophanes Scholasticus, a bureaucrat traveling from Egypt to Antioch between 317 and 324.

Flavius Dionysius served as governor of Phoenice from 328 to 329 and was the recipient of several laws and rescripts. A native of Sicily and an advocate, he also held the position of Consularis Syriae from 329 to 335. Additionally, he served as Comes (Consistorius) in 335 and was responsible for overseeing the Council of Tyre.

Archelaus was consularis of Phoenice in 335 and is referred to as hypatikos by Socrates Scholasticus. He is notably remembered for discovering in hiding Arsenius, a Melitian bishop, whose hand was falsely claimed by Eusebius' faction to have been used by Athanasius for magical rites after murdering its owner. During a trial, the severed hand was presented as evidence, but Athanasius exposed Arsenius, who was revealed to be alive and in full possession of both his hands.

Nonnus served as governor of Phoenice around 337, followed by Marcellinus, who held the position of praeses of Phoenice in 342. Later, Apollinaris governed Phoenice from 353 to 354, carrying the title of rector provinciae at Tyre. Apollinaris and his son were involved in the plot against Constantius Gallus and were executed, as reported by Ammianus Marcellinus.

=== Interactions with Libanius ===
By the 4th century, Phoenice was part of the Diocese of Oriens, which was governed by the comes Orientis based in Antioch. Both the comes Orientis and the governor of Syria resided in Antioch. Although Libanius lived in Antioch, located in the province of Syria, he was deeply involved in the political dynamics of both Syria and Phoenice, partly because his income came from both provinces.

The identities of many governors of Phoenice are known through Libanius's correspondence, as several had personal or professional connections with him in Antioch. Among them was Demetrius, a wealthy native of Tarsus from a prominent family, who served as governor of Phoenice sometime before 358. Another governor, Julianus, held office before 360 and later became proconsul of Asia in 360. Libanius regarded him as a good ruler, though he is distinct from another governor with the same name who served later.

Andronicus succeeded Julianus as governor, holding office from 360–361. He was a native of Constantinople and had been one of Libanius’s students. Libanius sent numerous letters to Andronicus, which provide insights into the scope of authority held by the Phoenician governor. While serving in 360, Andronicus received a letter from Libanius on behalf of Apringius, a law student, in which Libanius requests that the governor exempt Fraternus, the future father-in-law of Apringius, from civic obligations in Phoenice. In other letters from the same year, Libanius references Andronicus' governorship. One letter featured a traditional depiction of Phoenicia’s natural and cultural wealth, praising the region’s fertility, seasonal harmony, temples, and the production of purple dye. Libanius frequently sought favors from the governors; an example of this is a letter from 360 AD, in which he asks for Phoenician huntsmen to participate in a civic entertainment event in Antioch. Andronicus was renowned for his works in judicial processes, particularly his efforts to eliminate abuses, and for his reputation for incorruptibility.

After leaving office, Andronicus settled in Tyre; he was still in Phoenicia in 363 when he received a letter from Libanius in which Phoenicia was described as the "fairest spot in the world" during the governorship of Marius. Another governor, Aelius Claudius Dulcitius, a Roman official of humble origins, hailed from Phrygia. He rose to prominence during the reign of Emperor Constantius II, and according to the orator Libanius, Dulcitius was characterized by a love of wealth. He held the governorship of Phoenice sometime before 361.

==== Later governors ====
Anatolius, originally from Cilicia, served as governor of Phoenice in 361, accompanied by his sons, Apolinarius and Gemellus. Libanius wrote about the legal cases overseen by Anatolius during his tenure, notably recounting a high-profile case of rape committed by a tax collector. Libanius also offered a description of Phoenice at the time, portraying it as "the most civilized region of all," and governed by the rule of law.

Polycles, the governor of Phoenice from 361 to 362 was the first official appointed by Julian after he became sole emperor. However, Julian later dismissed him for incompetence, leading Polycles to harbor resentment toward him. However, Libanius defends Julian against Polycles' grievances.

Another Julianus served as consularis of Phoenice in 362. A native of Syria, he was highly skilled in Greek, Latin, and law, and later became comes Orientis in 364. Libanius sought Julianus’ assistance in restoring his salary supplement from Phoenice. Julianus held the position of consularis Phoenices as of September 3, 362. Libanius wrote to him to ensure the arrangement for the partial payment of his salary as a rhetoric teacher in Antioch was honored. This arrangement, restored by Salutius, Julian’s praetorian prefect, reversed a salary cut imposed by Helpidius.

The governor Libanius knew and valued most was Gaianus, who served as consularis of Phoenice from 362 to 363, succeeding Julianus. A native of Tyre, Gaianus was a pagan and an advocate who graduated from the Law School of Berytus. Before 362, he held the position of Assessor to an official in Antioch. According to Libanius, Gaianus owed his appointment to the use of charm or magic. Throughout his life, Libanius sent him numerous letters, ranging from requests to expressions of praise and friendship. In 363, Gaianus passed his position to Marius but remained in Phoenicia, where he continued to reside.

Marius I served as the consularis of Phoenice from 363 to 364. A native of Antioch, he was a pagan, a sophist, and a skilled orator, as described by Libanius. Marius retired in 364 and was succeeded by Ulpianus, who served as Governor of Phoenice in 364. Ulpianus, a rhetorician, had previously governed Cappadocia from 361 to 363 before his appointment in Phoenicia.

Domninus held the position of consularis of Phoenice from 364 to 365. A native of Larissa, Syria, he was an advocate before assuming office. During 365, Tyre and Sidon alongside several other coastal cities were damaged by a tsunami caused by the Crete earthquake. There is a significant gap in Libanius' preserved correspondence, spanning approximately 24 years, with letters resuming from 388 onward. However, the law codes reveal that Leontius served as consularis of Phoenice in 372, and Petrus held the same position in 380.

==== Theodosian era ====
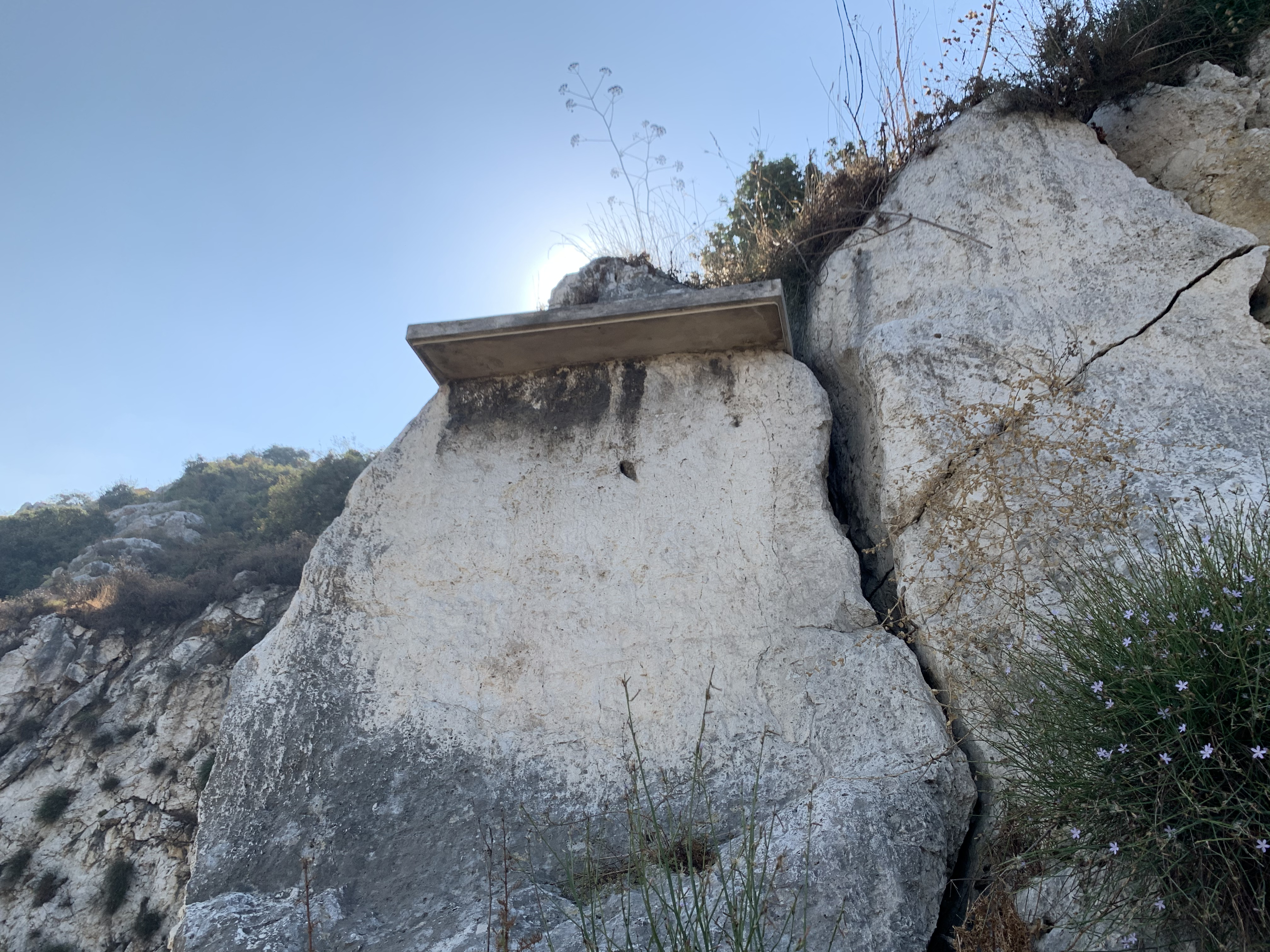
Commemorative inscription of Proculus (Inscription #11), Nahr el-Kalb. (Zoom in for epigraphic details)

Libanius resumed his correspondence with the governors of Phoenicia around 382 AD, during the reign of Theodosius I. The appointment of Proculus to this position is particularly noteworthy, as he was openly a pagan. Proculus, a native of Lycia, marked his tenure with a significant inscription above Berytus, commemorating the construction of a road through the mountains. Before 382, he served as Governor of Palestine and later became Governor of Phoenice in 382–383. Following this role, he assumed the position of Comes Orientis from 383 to 384.

Eustathius is believed to have served as Governor of Phoenice before 388. Libanius initially praised him for his skills as a rhetorician but later turned against him, criticizing him harshly. A native of Caria, Eustathius had little interest in the civil service or legal profession, leading him to study rhetoric in Athens. He later delivered numerous speeches in the cities of Phoenice, gaining the favor of a general from Antioch. Over the course of his career, he held three offices, rising from poverty to considerable wealth. He is later mentioned in connection with Phoenice, a reference that supports the theory he may have been governor there. After retiring, Eustathius was convicted of corruption and retreated to his estate in Tyre, where he was besieged by the Tyrians until he paid them off.

Antherius might have served as Governor of Phoenice or held another high-ranking position in 388. He is mentioned as a hegemon in a letter Libanius addressed to Gaianus, who had been the governor of Phoenice during the 360s. In 388, Epiphanius is also documented as the Governor (consularis) of Phoenice.

A second Domitius served as Governor (consularis) of Phoenice in 390, with authority to address complaints in Tyre. Severianus held the position of Governor (consularis) of Phoenice in 391, he also received correspondence from Libanius in 391. Leontius served as Governor of Phoenice in 392, and was referred to as archon. He is the last known governor of Phoenice mentioned in Libanius's correspondence.

== Division ==
Diocletian (r. 284–305) separated the district of Batanaea and gave it to Arabia, while sometime before 328, when it is mentioned in the Laterculus Veronensis, Constantine the Great (r. 306–337) created the new province of Augusta Libanensis out of the eastern half of the old province, encompassing the territory east of Mount Lebanon.

=== Phoenice I and Phoenice Libanensis ===
Constantine's province was short-lived, but formed the basis of the re-division of Phoenice c. 394 into the Phoenice I or Phoenice Paralia (Greek: Φοινίκη Παραλία, "coastal Phoenice"), and Phoenice II or Phoenice Libanensis (Φοινίκη Λιβανησία), with Tyre and Emesa as their respective capitals. In the Notitia Dignitatum, written shortly after the division, Phoenice I is governed by a consularis, while Libanensis is governed by a praeses, with both provinces under the Diocese of the East. This division remained intact until the Muslim conquest of the Levant in the 630s. Under the Caliphate, most of the two Phoenices came under the province of Damascus, with parts in the south and north going to the provinces of Jordan and Emesa respectively.

== Ecclesiastical administration ==
The ecclesiastical administration paralleled the political, but with some differences. The bishop of Tyre emerged as the pre-eminent prelate of Phoenice by the mid-3rd century.

== Military ==
Since the time of Septimius Severus, it had been the practice to assign not more than two legions to each frontier province, and, although in some provinces one legion was sometimes deemed sufficient, the upper limit was not exceeded. This policy appears to have been continued during the third century AD, as seen in the case of Aurelian raising the garrisons of Phoenice to the normal strength of two legions. Furthermore, during this century, the Third Legio Gallica was stationed in Tyre or Sidon.

In the late fourth century an edict to draft the sons of veterans was issued from Berytus.

== Economy ==
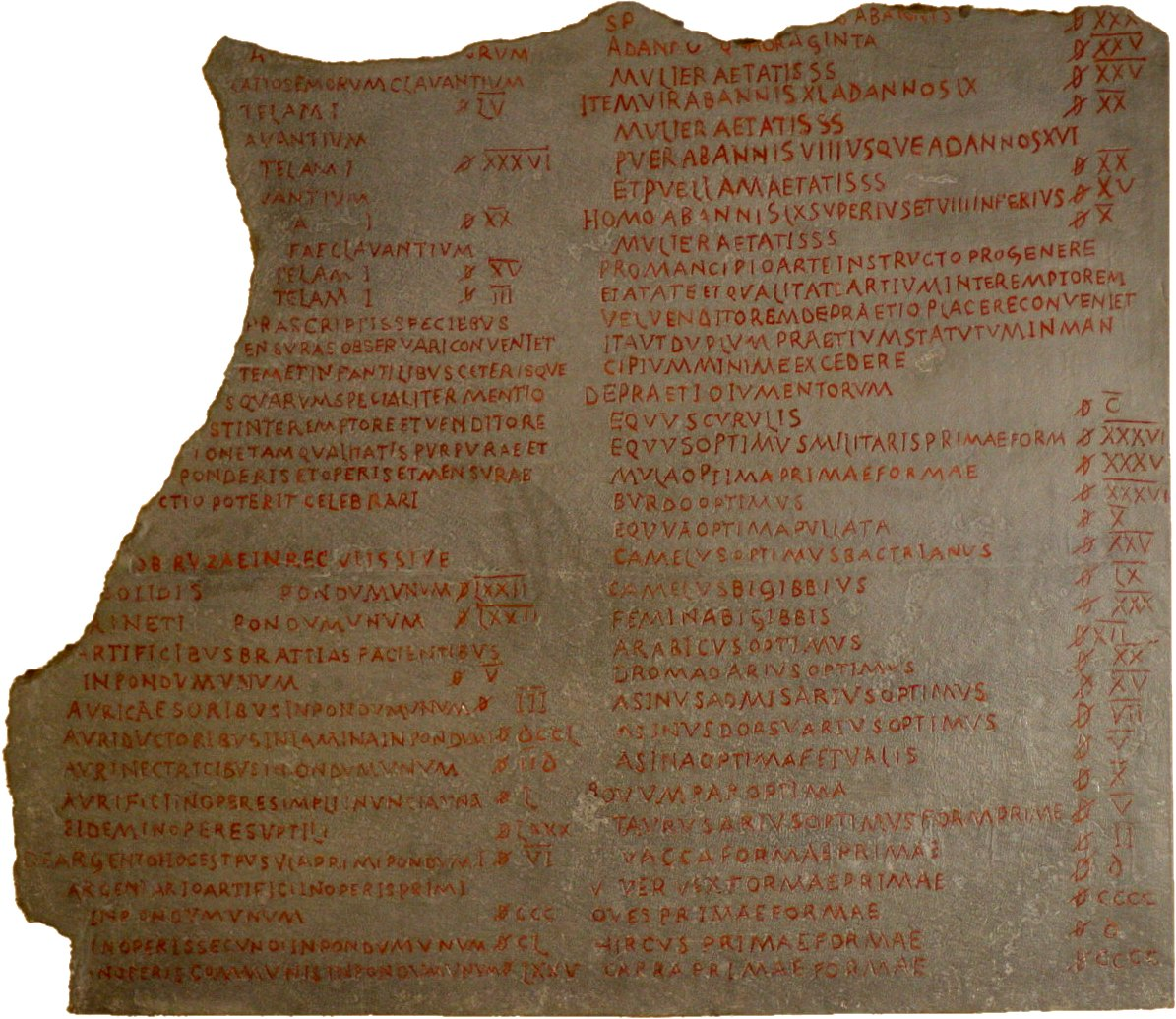
Piece of the Edict on Maximum Prices in the Pergamon Museum, Berlin

The Edict on Maximum Prices was issued by the emperor Diocletian in 301 AD, with the prices and simulated sailing times from Nicomedia to Berytus being 12 denarii for 9.9 days of duration with the ratio (price/duration) being 0.83.

During the fourth-century abundant crops of grain, wine, oil, and other products were attributed to the cities of Berytus, Byblos, Tyre, and Sarepta. Further evidence of agricultural production near Berytus is found in the fourth-century journal of the bureaucrat Theophanes, who traveled between Antioch and Egypt from 317 to 324 AD. In Berytus, Theophanes noted buying two types of bread ("pure white" for officials amongst his party and "coarse" for the servants), as well as grapes, figs, pumpkins or squashes, peaches, apricots, and cleaning supplies such as natron, bath oil, and soap. Similar purchases of bread, fresh produce, wine, and even snow to cool the wine (in Byblos) were made during each stop along the journey. They also came to Sidon on the following day and bought eggs.

=== Coinage ===
A coin from Berytus during the reign of Elagabalus depicts a grand archway adorned with columns and sculptures. During the reign of the Emperor Philip I the Arab (244-249 CE), bronze coins were struck at Heliopolis in honour of the legions Fifth Macedonia and Eighth Augusta.

A Roman mint was established in Tripolis, 273/274 AD and lasted till 286/287.

== List of governors ==
=== Propraetorial Imperial Legates of Phoenicia ===
Date	Legatus Augusti pro praetore (Governor of imperial province)
193–194	Ti. Manilius Fuscus
198	Q. Venidius Rufus Marius Maximus L. Calvinianus
c. 207	Domitius Leo Procillianus
213	D. Pius Cassius
Between 268 and 270	Salvius Theodorus
Between 284 and 305	L. Artorius Pius Maximus
292–293	Crispinus

=== Consulares of Phoenicia ===
In the fourth century, as a whole, almost 30 governors of Phoenicia are known with 23 governors of Phoenicia being in office between 353 and 394.

Date	Provincial governor (Consularis)
Between 293 and 305	Aelius Statuus
Between 293 and 303	Sossianus Hierocles
Before 305	Julius Julianus
? Between 309/313	Maximus
c. 323	Achillius
328 – 329	Fl. Dionysius
335	Archelaus
c. 337	Nonnus
342	Marcellinus
353/4	Apollinaris
Before 358	Demetrius
358 – 359	Nicentius
(?) 359/60	Euchrostius
Before 360	Julianus
360 – 361	Andronicus
Before 361	Aelius Claudius Dulcitius
361	Anatolius
c. 361/2	Polycles
362	Julianus
362 – 363	Gaianus
363 – 364	Marius
364	Ulpianus
364 – 365	Domninus
372	Leontius
380	Petrus
382 – 383	Proculus
Before 388	Eustathius
388	Antherius
388	Epiphanius
390	Domitius
391	Severianus
392	Leontius

== Sources ==
- Collinet, Paul (1869-1938) Auteur du texte (1925). Études historiques sur le droit de Justinien. 2, Histoire de l'école de droit de Beyrouth / par Paul Collinet,….
- Blankinship, Khalid Yahya (1994). The End of the Jihâd State: The Reign of Hishām ibn ʻAbd al-Malik and the Collapse of the Umayyads. Albany, New York: State University of New York Press. ISBN 978-0-7914-1827-7.
- Eißfeldt, Otto (1941). "Phoiniker (Phoinike)". Realencyclopädie der Classischen Altertumswissenschaft. Vol. Band XX, Halbband 39, Philon–Pignus. pp. 350–379.
- Schürer Emil, Vermes Geza, Millar Fergus, The history of the Jewish people in the age of Jesus Christ (175 B.C. – A.D. 135), Volume I, Edinburgh 1973, p. 243-266 (Survey of the Roman Province of Syria from 63 B.C. to A.D. 70).
- Linda Jones Hall, Roman Berytus: Beirut in late antiquity (2004)
- Martindale, J. R.; Jones, A. H. M, The Prosopography of the Later Roman Empire, Vol. I AD 260–395, Cambridge University Press (1971)
