= Tell Tuneinir =

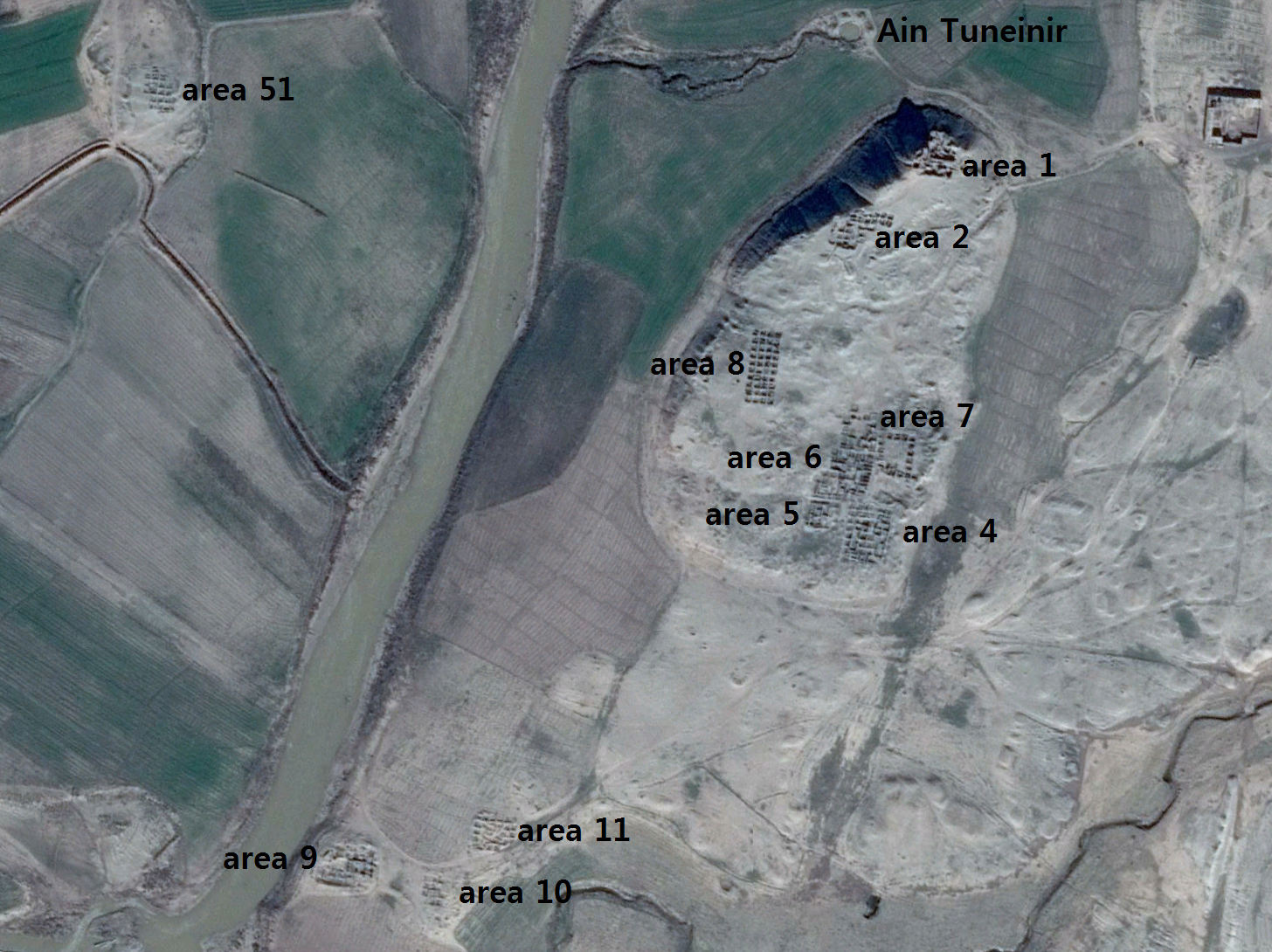
- A satellite image of Tell Tuneinir with the archaeological sites marked

- Location within Syria
- 36°25′18.6″N 40°51′59.5″E
- Type: Settlement
- Cultures: Byzantine, Ayyubid
- Location: Al-Hasakah Governorate, Syria
- Region: Mesopotamia

History
- Built: c. 2700 BC
- Abandoned: 1401 AD

Site notes
- Area: 40 hectares (99 acres).
- Excavation dates: 1977-1978, 1983-1984, 1986–2004
- Archaeologists: Michael Fuller, Neathery Fuller
- Public access: yes
- Website: https://users.stlcc.edu/mfuller/tuneinir/

Tell Tuneinir (also spelled Tunaynir or Touneynir) is an archaeological site in northeastern Syria. It dates to the early third millennium BC and shows signs of continuous habitation lasting until the beginning of the 15th century AD with epochs during the early Byzantine Empire, when it was known as the city of Thannuris (Thannourios), and during the Ayyubid period.

== Site and history ==
Tell Tuneinir is situated on the eastern bank of the Khabur river, 15 km (9.3 mi) southeast of Al-Hasakah, and have an area of 40 hectares (99 acres). It consists of a central mound, 18.2 metres (60 ft) high, surrounded by a lower city. The earliest occupation of the tell dates to the Ninevite V period c. 2700 BC. Bronze Age artifacts found include different kinds of pottery, bone tools, animals figurines made of clay depicting sheep, goats, and horses, and two clay; one has the shape of astragulus and the other the shape of a robe, thus they relate to animal products and textile manufacturing. The site's role as an agricultural settlement is apparent by the existence of decorated sherds depicting animals grazing. By 2000 BC, the region witnessed large scale settlement abandonment and many sites were never reoccupied but Tell Tuneinir was not affected by the phenomenon; pottery and a cylinder seal discovered in the site demonstrated that it remained inhabited throughout the second and first millennia BC.

=== Roman period ===
When the Khabur turned into the frontier between the Roman Empire and its rival, the Parthian Empire, in the first century BC, Tell Tuneinir evolved from a small agricultural settlement into an important town. The ala prima nova Diocletiana, an equites sagittarii indigenae ("indigenous horse archers") unit, was stationed in the region between Tell Tuneinir, now named Thannuris, and Horaba (modern Tell Ajaja).

According to the 6th-century historian Procopius, there existed two cities with the name Thannourios. The Byzantine emperor Justinian I (r. 527–565) decided to fortify Thannuris, but the first such attempt failed, as the Byzantine army under Belisarius was defeated by the Sassanid Persians. Eventually Justinian's efforts were successful, and the town became a "truly formidable" fortress, to protect the region from Saracen raids. Nevertheless, the Persians captured the fortress in 587, when it had apparently been left undefended.

=== Islamic period ===
During the early Islamic period, Tell Tuneinir evolved into a small city. In 1401, the armies of Timur destroyed the city. In the Ottoman era, bedouin semi-nomads erected their tents alongside the Durin canal, (Note: The Durin canal dates to the third millennium BC and runs alongside the eastern bank of the Khabur.) and Tell Tuneinir became a center for the taxation of those settlers; an Ottoman military building and tombs were found in the site.

== Society ==
In the late Middle Ages, the city's population consisted of Arabic-speaking Muslims and Syriac-speaking Christians; the Syriacs show a cultural continuity throughout the Islamic era—from the Umayyad and Abbasid periods to the Ayyubid period—which is evident from the continuous use of the city's church between the 6th and 12th centuries. The city also had a monastery, which was first constructed of limestone in the fifth/sixth century and which was occupied and renovated several times until the fifteenth century.

== Excavations ==
In 1853, Austen Henry Layard explored the site in the frame of his general survey of the Khabur valley and two more surveys were conducted by Friedrich Sarre and Ernst Herzfeld in 1911 and by Antoine Poidebard in 1934 who provided maps of the sites. In 1977-1978, the site was studied by Wolfgang Röllig and Hartmut Kühne then by Jean-Yves Monchambert in 1983 and 1984. The Syrian plans to build Al-Basil dam on the Khabur threatened many archaeological sites; at the request of the Syrian Directorate-General of Antiquities and Museums, the St. Louis Community College formed a team headed by Michael and Neathery Fuller to evaluate the site in 1986. Excavations began in 1987, and the dam was completed in 1997 with further excavations depending on the rainfall. The site was last excavated in 2004.
