= Xerxes (Sasanian prince) =

6th-century Sassanid Persian prince

Xerxes was a 6th-century Sassanid Persian prince who distinguished himself in war against the Byzantine Empire.

He was the son of the Sasanian king Kavad I, and is first mentioned as a Sasanian general during the Iberian War between the Byzantine and Sassanid Empires. In 528, Xerxes leading an army numbering 30,000 men defeated the Byzantines at the Battle of Thannuris by stratagem, killing or capturing many of them along with their commanders.

However, the victory was costly, and the army of Xerxes had lost ca. 500 of his Immortal units. These losses enraged Kavadh I, who had Coutzes imprisoned and disgraced Xerxes.

== Sources ==
- Greatrex, Geoffrey; Lieu, Samuel N. C. (2002). The Roman Eastern Frontier and the Persian Wars (Part II, 363–630 AD). London, United Kingdom: Routledge. ISBN 0-415-14687-9.
- Martindale, John Robert; Jones, Arnold Hugh Martin; Morris, J., eds. (1992). The Prosopography of the Later Roman Empire, Volume III: A.D. 527–641. Cambridge, United Kingdom: Cambridge University Press. ISBN 978-0-521-20160-5.
- Shahîd, Irfan (1995). Byzantium and the Arabs in the Sixth Century. Vol. 1: Political and Military History. Dumbarton Oaks Research Library and Collection.
