= Vitalian (consul) =

Byzantine General

- Born: Zaldapa (modern-day Abrit, Bulgaria)
- Died: July 520; Constantinople
- Relatives: Bouzes, Coutzes and Venilus (sons); John (nephew)
- Military career
- Allegiance: Byzantine Empire
- Rank: magister militum

Vitalian (Latin: Vitalianus, Greek: Βιταλιανός; died 520) was a general of the Byzantine Empire. A native of Moesia in the northern Balkans, and of Thracian descent, he followed his father into the imperial army, and by 513 had become a senior commander in Thrace.

In that year he rebelled against Emperor Anastasius I (r. 491–518), whose fiscal stringency and promotion of Miaphysitism were widely unpopular, and allowed Vitalian to quickly win over large parts of the army and the people of Thrace to his cause. After scoring a series of victories over loyalist armies, Vitalian came to threaten Constantinople itself, and forced Anastasius to officially recant his adoption of Miaphysitism in summer 515. Soon after, however, as Anastasius failed to honour some of the terms of the agreement, Vitalian marched on Constantinople, only to be decisively defeated by Anastasius' admiral, Marinus.

Vitalian fled to his native Thrace and remained in hiding until Anastasius's death in 518. As a staunch promoter of Chalcedonian orthodoxy, he was pardoned by the new emperor Justin I (r. 518–527) and was engaged in the negotiations with the Pope to end the Acacian Schism. He was named consul for the year 520, but was murdered shortly after, probably on the orders of Justin's nephew and heir-apparent, Justinian (r. 527–565), who saw in him a potential rival for the throne. His sons also became generals in the Byzantine army.

== Biography ==
=== Origins and family ===
Vitalian was born in Zaldapa in Lower Moesia (usually identified with modern Abrit in north-eastern Bulgaria). He is called a "Goth" or a "Scythian" in the Byzantine sources. Since Vitalian's mother was a sister of Macedonius II, Patriarch of Constantinople in 496–511, this points to a mixed marriage and a probable barbarian origin for his father, Patriciolus. On the other hand, the assertion that he was a "Goth" is based on a single Syriac source, and is today considered dubious. Likewise, the "Scythian" label commonly applied to him by some contemporary authors is non-conclusive, since the term "Scythian" could mean an inhabitant of Scythia Minor, or simply, in the classicizing language usual in Byzantine texts, someone from the north-eastern fringes of the Graeco-Roman world, centred on the Mediterranean; the term had a wide-encompassing meaning, devoid of clear ethnic attributes. Furthermore, since none of the "Scythian Monks", to whom Vitalian and members of his family seem to have been related, expressed any kinship, by blood or spiritually, with the Arian Goths who at that time ruled Italy, a Gothic origin for Vitalian is questionable. Whatever Patriciolus's origin, his name was Latin, while of Vitalian's own sons, the generals Bouzes and Coutzes had Thracian names and Venilus a Gothic name. His nephew, John, later also became a distinguished general in the wars against the Ostrogoths of Italy.

According to the chroniclers' descriptions, Vitalian was short of stature and stammered, but his personal bravery and military skills were widely acknowledged.

Vitalian seems to have been of local Latinised Dacian-Getic (Thracian) stock, born in Scythia Minor or in Moesia; his father bore a Latin name, Patriciolus, while two of his sons had Thracian names and one a Gothic name.

=== Revolt against Anastasius ===
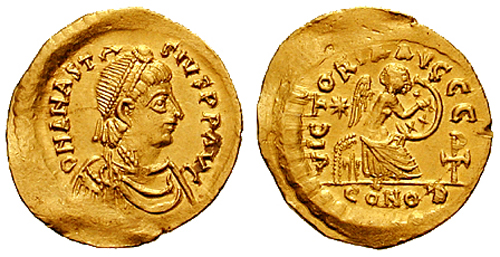
Gold semissis of Emperor Anastasius I (r. 491–518). Obv.: D N ANASTASIVS P P AVG. Rev.: VICTORIA AUGGG, XX on shield, CONOB. 2.25 gr.

Vitalian is first mentioned in 503, when he accompanied his father in the Anastasian War against the Persians. By 513, he had risen to the rank of comes in Thrace, possibly comes foederatorum, "count of the foederati", barbarian soldiers serving in the Byzantine army.

From this post, he rebelled against Emperor Anastasius I (r. 491–518), taking advantage of widespread resentment over the emperor's military, religious, and social policies. In 511, Anastasius had changed the form of the Trisagion prayer and officially adopted the Miaphysite dogma, angering the Empire's Chalcedonian population, and adding to the disaffection caused by his strict financial policies. Furthermore, Anastasius had refused to supply the annonae ("rations, provisions") due to the foederati, allowing Vitalian to quickly gain the allegiance of the regular troops stationed in the provinces of Thrace, Moesia II, and Scythia Minor from the unpopular magister militum per Thracias, Anastasius' nephew Hypatius. Hypatius's subordinate commanders were either killed or joined the rebellion. At the same time, posing as a champion of Chalcedonian orthodoxy, Vitalian was able to gain the support of the local people, who flocked to join his force. According to contemporary Byzantine historians, he quickly assembled an army of 50,000–60,000 men, "both soldiers and peasants", and marched on Constantinople, possibly hoping that the mostly Chalcedonian inhabitants would join him. Indeed, it appears that Vitalian's revolt was primarily motivated by religious reasons, something suggested by his repeatedly demonstrated willingness to reach an accommodation with Anastasius. To counter Vitalian's propaganda, Anastasius ordered bronze crosses to be set up on the city walls inscribed with his own version of events. The emperor also reduced taxes in the provinces of Bithynia and Asia to prevent them from joining the rebellion.

When Vitalian's forces reached the capital, they encamped at the suburb of Hebdomon and blockaded the landward side of the city. Anastasius opted for negotiations, and sent out Vitalian's former patron, the former consul and magister militum praesentalis Patricius, as ambassador. To him, Vitalian declared his aims: the restoration of Chalcedonian orthodoxy and the settling of the Thracian army's grievances. Patricius then invited him and his officers in the city itself for negotiations. Vitalian refused for himself, but allowed his senior officers to go on the next day. The officers were well treated by Anastasius, who gave them gifts and promised that their soldiers' grievances would be settled. He also pledged to submit the religious dispute for resolution to the Patriarch of Rome. Upon their return to the rebel camp, these officers unanimously pressured Vitalian to accept this settlement. Faced with no alternative, only eight days after his arrival before the capital, Vitalian retreated and returned with his men to Lower Moesia.

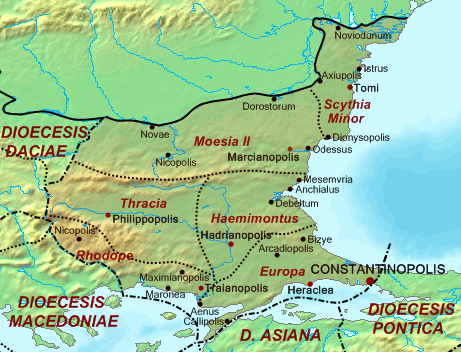
Map of the Diocese of Thrace, the theatre of operations during Vitalian's rebellion.

Anastasius then appointed as magister militum per Thracias an officer called Cyril, who proceeded to attack Vitalian's forces. After a few inconclusive skirmishes, Vitalian managed to bribe his army's entry into Odessus, Cyril's base, at night. Cyril was captured at his residence and killed. At this point, Anastasius had Vitalian declared a "public enemy" and sent out a huge new army – reportedly 80,000 men – under Hypatius, with a Hun called Alathar as the new magister militum of Thrace. After winning a minor initial victory, the imperial army was eventually pushed back towards Odessus (autumn 513). At Acris, on the Black Sea coast, Vitalian's men attacked their fortified laager in darkness and dealt them a crushing defeat: the larger part of the imperial army was killed, and both imperial commanders were taken prisoner and held for ransom.

The victory consolidated Vitalian's position. With the spoils, he was able to lavishly reward his followers, and at the news of the imperial army's annihilation, the remaining cities and forts in Lower Moesia and Scythia surrendered to him. Soon after, he had another stroke of luck: at Sozopolis, his men captured an embassy sent by Anastasius to ransom Hypatius, including the ransom money of 1,100 pounds of gold. Hypatius, whom Vitalian hated because he had once insulted his wife, was not released until a year later. In 514, Vitalian marched again towards Constantinople, this time gathering, in addition to his army, a fleet of 200 vessels from the Black Sea ports, which sailed down the Bosporus menacing the city from the sea as well. Anastasius was further disquieted by riots in the city, which left many casualties, and resolved to once again negotiate with Vitalian. Vitalian accepted, on the conditions of his nomination to the post of magister militum per Thracias and the receipt of ransom money and gifts worth 5,000 pounds of gold for the release of Hypatius. Anastasius also acceded to the removal of the changes from the Trisagion, the restoration of the deposed Chalcedonian bishops, and the convocation of a general church council at Constantinople on 1 July 515.

The council never materialized, since Pope Hormisdas and Anastasius continued to be at loggerheads over the Acacian Schism. Neither were the deposed bishops returned to their sees. Seeing Anastasius failing to honour his promises, in late 515 Vitalian mobilized his army and marched again towards Constantinople. Vitalian's army captured the suburb of Sycae (modern Galata) across the Golden Horn from the city and encamped there. The two magistri militum praesentalis, Patricius and John, were unwilling to engage their old friend Vitalian, thus Anastasius gave command of his forces to the former praetorian prefect of the East, Marinus, a trusted and influential aide. Despite his lack of military experience, Marinus defeated the rebel fleet in a battle at the entrance of the Golden Horn; according to the report of John Malalas, this was achieved through the use of a sulphur-based chemical substance invented by the philosopher Proclus of Athens, similar to the later Greek fire. Marinus then landed with his men on the shore of Sycae and defeated the rebels he found there. Disheartened by the losses suffered, Vitalian and his army fled north under cover of night. As a sign of his victory, Anastasius led a procession to the village of Sosthenion, where Vitalian had established his headquarters, and attended a service of thanks at the famed local church dedicated to the Archangel Michael.

=== Later life ===
Once back in northern Thrace, Vitalian went into hiding, while many of his erstwhile aides were captured and executed. Nothing is known of him for the next three years, although a short remark by a chronicler seems to indicate that he resurfaced and led another armed rebellion during the last months of Anastasius's life. When Anastasius died in July 518, he was succeeded by Justin I, the comes excubitorum (commander of the imperial bodyguard). The new emperor quickly moved to strengthen his rule, dismissing a number of potential rivals or enemies. At the same time, he called upon Vitalian to come to Constantinople.

Upon his arrival, Vitalian was made magister militum in praesenti, named honorary consul, and soon after raised to the rank of patricius. As a well-known champion of Chalcedonian orthodoxy, Vitalian was to play a role in the new regime's reaffirmation of the Chalcedonian doctrines and reconciliation with Rome. He played an active role in the negotiations with the Pope, and in 519, he was one of the prominent men who escorted a papal delegation into the capital. Vitalian also took vengeance on the staunchly Monophysite Patriarch of Antioch, Severus, who had celebrated Vitalian's defeat in his panegyric On Vitalian the tyrant and on the victory of the Christ-loving Anastasius the king: Justin ordered Severus's tongue to be cut out, and Severus fled to Egypt along with Julian, Bishop of Halicarnassus.

Finally in 520, Vitalian was appointed ordinary consul for the year, sharing the office with Rusticius. Some scholars such as Brian Croke and Peter Sarris argue that, contrary to Procopius' account which states that Justinian was the leading figure in Justin's regime almost immediately, by this point Vitalian was 'the most powerful man in court after the emperor'. Nevertheless, the former rebel continued to pose a potential challenge to Justin, and more importantly to his nephew and heir-apparent, Justinian (r. 527–565). Thus, in July of the same year he was murdered inside the Great Palace along with his secretary Paulus and his domesticus (aide) Celerianus. According to John of Nikiou, he was killed because he was plotting against Justin; most chroniclers including Procopius, the preeminent chronicler of the reign of Justin's successor Justinian, however, put the responsibility for the crime on Justinian's desire to rid himself of a potential rival for his uncle's succession. However, modern scholars such as Croke have suggested that neither narrative surrounding Vitalian's death may be accurate and that Vitalian may have been killed simply for the latent threat he represented to Justin's rule.

== See also ==
Preceded by Iustinus Augustus I, Eutharicus Cillica	Roman consul 520 with Rusticius	Succeeded by Petrus Sabbatius Iustinianus, Valerius
