= 540s =

Decade

The 540s decade ran from January 1, 540, to December 31, 549.

== Events ==
=== By place ===
==== Byzantine Empire ====
- Emperor Justinian I offers to make peace with Vitiges, but Belisarius refuses to transmit the message. The Ostrogoths then offer to support Belisarius as emperor of the West.
- May – Gothic War: Belisarius conquers Mediolanum (modern-day Milan) and the Gothic capital Ravenna. Vitiges and his wife Matasuntha are taken as captives to Constantinople.
- Belisarius consolidates Italy and begins mopping-up operations, capturing the Gothic fortifications. The cities Ticinum and Verona north of River Po remain in Gothic hands.
- Ildibad succeeds Vitiges as king of the Ostrogoths, and installs his nephew Totila as commander of the Gothic army. He recaptures Venetia and Liguria in Northern Italy.

==== Europe ====
- King Custennin ap Cado is deposed, and returns to Dumnonia in the south-west of Great Britain.

==== Persia ====
- King Khosrow I breaks the "Eternal Peace" treaty with the Byzantine Empire after eight years. Responding to an embassy from the Ostrogoths urging action against Emperor Justinian I's expanding power, he leads the Persian army up the River Euphrates. Extracting tributes from towns along the way, Khosrau I besieges and captures Antioch. He plunders the city extensively, transporting valuable artworks, including marble statues and mosaics, back to Persia.

==== Africa ====
- Solomon captures the Aurès Mountains from the Moors and extends Byzantine authority over Numidia and Mauretania Sitifensis. The city of Theveste (Algeria) is restored and fortified.

==== Asia ====
- Jinheung becomes king of the Korean kingdom of Silla.

=== By topic ===
==== Religion ====
- Cassiodorus, former Roman statesman, establishes a monastery at his estate in Italy. The Vivarium "monastery school" is for highly educated and sophisticated men, who copy sacred and secular manuscripts, intending for this to be their sole occupation (approximate date).
- Pope Vigilius rejects Monophysitism in letters to Justinian I and patriarch Menas of Constantinople.
- Benedict of Nursia writes his monastic rules, containing precepts for his monks (approximate date).

==== World ====
- Global environmental cooling occurs, due either to a comet impact or volcanic eruption in Central America, evidenced by global tree ring growth diminution. Recent evidence from Swiss ice core points to volcanic eruptions in Iceland. Historical evidence records this earlier as the Extreme weather events of 535–536.

=== By place ===
==== Byzantine Empire ====
- January 1 – Anicius Faustus Albinus Basilius is appointed as consul in Constantinople, the last person to hold this office.
- Plague of Justinian: Bubonic plague appears suddenly in the Egyptian port of Pelusium, spreading to Alexandria and, the following year, to Constantinople. This is the beginning of a 200-year-long pandemic that will devastate Europe, the Middle East, and North Africa.
- Emperor Justinian I recalls Belisarius from Italy to handle the situation in Armenia. He arrives in Upper Mesopotamia and attacks the fortress city of Nisbis. After an unsuccessful siege he ravages the countryside.
- John the Cappadocian, praetorian prefect of the East, is dismissed by the Byzantine empress Theodora for treason. He is banished to Cyzicus, and his estates are confiscated.

==== Europe ====
- Autumn – Totila is elected king by the Ostrogothic nobles after the death of his uncle Ildibad. He wins the support of the lower classes by liberating slaves and distributing land to the peasants.
- Winter – Siege of Verona: Totila defends the city of Verona against a numerically superior Byzantine army. He gains control over the Po Valley and prepares a Gothic offensive in Central Italy.

==== Persia ====
- Lazic War: King Khosrau I intervenes in Lazica (modern Georgia), and supports the weakened king Gubazes II against a full-scale uprising. He sends an expeditionary force under Mermeroes and captures the Byzantine stronghold of Petra, located on the coast of the Black Sea, which provides the Persians a strategic port.

==== Asia ====
- Lý Bí initiates a rebellion against the ruling Chinese Liang dynasty in Giao Châu province.
- The Uyghurs come under the rule of the Hephthalites (approximate date).

=== By topic ===
==== Religion ====
- Jacob Baradaeus becomes bishop of Edessa (approximate date).

=== By place ===
==== Byzantine Empire ====
- Plague of Justinian: Bubonic plague, spread from Egypt, kills at least 230,000 in Constantinople (modern Istanbul; before counting stops), and perhaps two million or more in the rest of the empire. Emperor Justinian I contracts the disease but recovers.
- Lazic War – Justinian I sends a Byzantine army (30,000 men) to Armenia. The Persians, severely outnumbered, are forced to retreat, but at Dvin the Byzantines are defeated by a force of 4,000 men in an ambush, and are completely routed.
- The 542 Sea of Marmara earthquake takes place in the winter of 542, in the vicinity of the Sea of Marmara. It also affects the coasts of Thrace and the Edremit Gulf.

==== Europe ====
- Spring – Battle of Faventia: King Totila scatters the Byzantine forces near Faventia (modern Faenza) with 5,000 men, beginning the resurgence of Gothic resistance to the reconquest of Italy.
- Battle of Mucellium: Totila marches down into Tuscany and defeats the Byzantines at Florence, in the valley of Mugello. He treats his prisoners well, and many are induced to join his banner.
- March – Totila bypasses Rome and begins his expedition in Southern Italy. He captures Beneventum and receives the submission of the provinces of Apulia, Lucania and Bruttium.
- Siege of Naples: Totila besieges the city of Naples in Campania. A Byzantine relief force from Sicily is intercepted and almost destroyed by Gothic warships.
- King Childebert I and his brother Chlothar I invade Visigothic Spain. They capture Pamplona, but Zaragoza withstands a siege and the Franks retreat to Gaul. From this expedition Childebert brings back to Paris a relic, the tunic of Saint Vincent.

=== By topic ===
==== Religion ====
- Brendan establishes a monastic settlement on Eileach an Naoimh (approximate date).

==== Literature ====
- Gildas, British monk, writes his work "De Excidio et Conquestu Britanniae" (approximate date).

=== By place ===
==== Europe ====
- Spring – Siege of Naples (542–543): The Byzantine garrison (1,000 men) in Naples surrenders to the Ostrogoths, pressed by famine and demoralized by the failure of two relief efforts. The defenders are well treated by King Totila, and the garrison is allowed safe departure, but the city walls are partly razed.

==== Africa ====
- The fortress city of Old Dongola (modern Sudan) along the River Nile becomes the capital of the Kingdom of Makuria. Several churches are built, including the "Old Church" (approximate date).

==== Persia ====
- Summer – Khosrow I, Shahanshah of the Sasanian Empire, invades Syria again, and turns south towards Edessa to besiege the fortress city.
- The Hephthalites threaten the Sasanian Empire from the East. They extend their domain in Central Asia (approximate date).
- Battle of Anglon: A Byzantine invasion of Persarmenia is defeated by a much smaller force from the Sasanian Empire.

==== Asia ====
- King Pulakeshin I establishes the Chalukya dynasty in India. He extends his kingdom by conquering Vakataka and the west coast of Karnataka, giving him access to the valuable Arabian Sea trade routes.

=== By topic ===
==== Learning ====
- Approximate date – The Yupian (玉篇) Chinese dictionary is edited by Gu Yewang.

==== Religion ====
- The doctrine of apocatastasis is condemned by the Synod of Constantinople.

=== By place ===
==== The Mediterranean World, Europe, and the Middle East ====
- Gothic War: Emperor Justinian I sends Belisarius back to the Ostrogothic Kingdom (Italy) with an inadequate Byzantine expeditionary force (4,000 men and 200 ships).
- Belisarius defeats the Gothic army under King Totila, who unsuccessfully besieges the city of Otranto (southern Italy). After their retreat, the Byzantines march towards the city of Rome.
- Justinian I issues a new edict condemning the Three Chapters. In Western Europe, Pope Vigilius refuses to acknowledge the imperial edict and is ordered to summon to Constantinople.
- King Khosrau I unsuccessfully attacks the Byzantine fortress city of Dara. The siege of Edessa is repulsed, and the Persians are forced into a stalemate.
- Battle of Cillium: A medium-sized Byzantine army under Solomon is defeated by the Moors on the border of Numidia. Solomon and his bodyguard are forced to retreat and are later killed.

==== Asia ====
- February – Lý Bí is declared emperor and establishes the empire Van Xuân (modern Vietnam). His armies repel attacks from the kingdom of Champa.
- October – The Liang dynasty retaliates against Van Xuân, and sends an imperial army (120,000 men) under Chen Baxian to re-occupy the region.

=== By topic ===
==== Religion ====
- Jacob Baradaeus consecrates Sergius of Tella as patriarch of Antioch, opening a permanent schism between the Syriac Orthodox Church and the Eastern Orthodox Church.

=== By place ===
==== Byzantine Empire ====
- Emperor Justinian I sends Narses, Byzantine general, to the rulers of the Heruli, to recruit troops for the campaigns in Italy and Syria.

==== Europe ====
- Gothic War: King Totila establishes his military base at Tivoli (Central Italy), and prepares a campaign to reconquer the region of Latium.
- The monastery of Clonmacnoise is founded in Ireland by Ciarán Mac a tSaor on the River Shannon (approximate date).

==== Asia ====
- Yangwon becomes ruler of the Korean kingdom of Goguryeo.

==== Persia ====
- King Khosrau I signs a five year truce with the Byzantine Empire, but war continues to ravage the Caucasus region, especially in Armenia.

=== By topic ===
==== Religion ====
- The Synod of Brefi is held at Llanddewi Brefi, to condemn the Pelagian heresy. Dubricius, archbishop of South Wales, resigns his position in favour of David (approximate date).

=== By place ===
==== Byzantine Empire ====
- December 17 – Sack of Rome: After almost a year's siege, the capture of a grain fleet sent by the exiled Pope Vigilius near the mouth of the Tiber, and failure of troops of the Byzantine Empire under Belisarius to relieve the city, the Ostrogoths under King Totila plunder Rome and destroy its fortifications. He then withdraws to Apulia (Southern Italy).
- Winter – Pope Vigilius arrives in Constantinople, to meet with Emperor Justinian I. The future Pope Pelagius I is sent by Totila to negotiate with Justinian.

==== Europe ====
- Audoin murders and succeeds Walthari as king of the Lombards.
- Audoin receives subsidies from Justinian I, to encourage him to battle the Gepids in the Carpathian Mountains.
- Audoin leads the Lombards across the Danube into Pannonia, and becomes an ally of the Byzantines.

==== Central America ====
- May 5 – First Tikal-Calakmul War: After a victory by Calakmul, Aj Wosal Chan K'inich is installed as the new ruler of the Mayan city state of Naranjo in Guatemala, and reigns until his death in 615.

=== By topic ===
==== Religion ====
- The Basilica of San Vitale (Ravenna) is completed by bishop Maximianus, during the Byzantine Exarchate of Ravenna.
- Approximate date – The Diocese of Bangor is established in the Welsh kingdom of Gwynedd, with Deiniol consecrated as first bishop.

=== By place ===
==== Europe ====
- Gothic War: Belisarius recaptures Rome from the Ostrogoths, but his Italian campaign is unsuccessful (he is starved of supplies and reinforcements from Constantinople).
- The mosaic panels of Justinian I and Theodora I with attendants, in the Basilica of San Vitale (Ravenna), are made (approximate date).
- Theudebald, age 13, succeeds his father Theudebert I after a reign of 14 years, and becomes king of Austrasia (or 548).

==== Britain ====
- King Ida establishes the kingdom of Bernicia. He builds Bamburgh Castle (northeast England) as a fortress that will become the seat of Anglo-Saxon kings (according to the Historia Brittonum).

==== Africa ====
- Battle of Marta: The Byzantine army under John Troglita is defeated by Moorish tribes in Tripolitania. He flees to Lunci (9 km south of Mahares), and is forced to withdraw north to the fortress of Laribus (near modern El Kef).

==== Asia ====
- The Tonkin revolt (Vietnam), led by Lý Nam Đế, is suppressed by the Chinese Liang dynasty.

=== By topic ===
==== Religion ====
- The Basilica of San Vitale (Ravenna) is consecrated by bishop Maximianus of Ravenna.

=== By place ===
==== Byzantine Empire ====
- June 28 – Empress Theodora I dies at age 48, probably of breast cancer (according to Bishop Victor of Tunnuna). Her body is buried in the Church of the Holy Apostles (Constantinople).
- Emperor Justinian I relieves Belisarius from military service, in favour of 70-year-old Byzantine general Narses.

==== Europe ====
- Theudigisel, Visigothic general, proclaims himself ruler over the Visigothic Kingdom, after King Theudis is assassinated.

==== Persia ====
- Lazic War: King Gubazes II revolts against the Persians, and requests aid from Justinian I. He sends a Byzantine expeditionary force (8,000 men) to Lazica (modern Georgia).
- Gubazes II besieges the fortress of Petra, located on the Black Sea. The Persian army under Mermeroes defeats a small Byzantine force guarding the mountain passes, and relieves Petra.
- Mermeroes stations a garrison of 3,000 men in the stronghold of Petra, and marches to Armenia. The Persians, lacking sufficient supplies, secure the supply routes and plunder Lazica.

==== Africa ====
- Spring – Battle of the Fields of Cato: The Byzantine army, under John Troglita, crushes the Moorish revolt in Byzacena (Tunisia).

==== Asia ====
- April 13 – Emperor Lý Nam Đế of Vietnam is killed by Laotian tribesmen, while on retreat from the Hong River Plain. He is succeeded by his elder brother Lý Thiên Bảo.

=== By topic ===
==== Commerce ====
- Cosmas Indicopleustes, Alexandrian merchant, writes his work Christian Topography. He describes the importance of the spice trade (especially in cloves and sweet aloes) in Ceylon, and the harvesting of pepper in India (approximate date).

==== Religion ====
- Saint Catherine's Monastery is established in the Sinai Peninsula.

=== By place ===
==== Byzantine Empire ====
- Siege of Rome: The Ostrogoths under Totila besiege Rome for the third time, after Belisarius has returned to Constantinople. He offers a peace agreement, but this is rejected by Emperor Justinian I.
- Totila conquers the city of Perugia (Central Italy) and stations a Gothic garrison. He takes bishop Herculanus prisoner, and orders him to be completely flayed. The Ostrogoth soldier asked to perform this gruesome execution shows pity, and decapitates Herculanus before the skin on every part of his body is removed.
- In the Circus Maximus, first and largest circus in Rome, the last chariot races are held.

==== Europe ====
- January - Battle of Ciiil Conaire, Ireland: Ailill Inbanda and his brother are defeated and killed.
- Agila I succeeds Theudigisel as king of the Visigoths, after he is murdered by a group of conspirators during a banquet in Seville.

==== Persia ====
- Spring – Lazic War: The Byzantine army under Bessas combines forces with King Gubazes II, and defeats the Persians in Lazica (modern Georgia) in a surprise attack. The survivors retreat into Caucasian Iberia.
  - The Romans unsuccessfully besiege Petra, Lazica.

==== Asia ====
- Jianwen Di succeeds his father Wu Di as emperor of the Liang Dynasty (China).

=== By topic ===
==== Religion ====
- c. 549–564 – Transfiguration of Christ, mosaic in the apse, Church of the Virgin, Saint Catherine's Monastery in Egypt, is made.
- Fifth Council of Orléans: Nine archbishops and forty-one bishops pronounce an anathema against the errors of Nestorius and Eutyches.
- Bishop Maximianus of Ravenna consecrates the Basilica of Sant'Apollinare in Classe.
- The Roman Catholic Diocese of Ossory (which still exists) is founded in Ireland.

== Significant people ==
- Totila
- Pope Gregory I
- Abu Quhafa

== Births ==
540

- October 12 – Yōmei, emperor of Japan (d. 587)
- Authari, king of the Lombards (approximate date)
- Columbanus, Irish missionary (or 543)
- Galswintha, Neustrian queen, married to Chilperic I (d. 568)
- Garibald I, duke of Bavaria (d. 591)
- Pope Gregory I ("the Great") (d. 604)
- John of Biclaro, Visigoth chronicler (approximate date)
- Myrddin Wyllt, Welsh legend (approximate date)

541

- July 21 – Emperor Wen of Sui, emperor of the Sui dynasty (d. 604)

542

- Su Wei, high official of the Sui dynasty (d. 623)
- Xiao Min Di, emperor of Northern Zhou (d. 557)
- Xiao Ming Di, emperor of the Liang dynasty (d. 585)

543

- Brunhilda, queen of Austrasia (approximate date)
- Columbanus, Irish missionary (d. 615)
- Jing Di, emperor of the Liang dynasty (d. 558)
- Wu Di, emperor of Northern Zhou (d. 578)

544

- Dugu Qieluo, empress of the Sui dynasty (d. 602)
- Jing Di, emperor of the Liang dynasty (d. 558)
- Yuwen Xian, prince of Northern Zhou (d. 578)

545

- Abd Allah ibn Abd al Muttalib, father of Muhammad (d. 570)
- Fei Di, emperor of Northern Qi (d. 561)
- Peter, Byzantine general (d. 602)

547

- Pei Ju, official of the Sui dynasty and Tang dynasty (d. 627)
- Zhu Manyue, empress of Northern Zhou (d. 586)

548

- Xiao Zhuang, crown prince of the Southern Dynasties (approximate date)

549

- Abū Lahab, uncle and staunch critic of Muhammad (d. 624)
- Jizang, Chinese Buddhist monk (d. 623)

== Deaths ==
540

- Dignāga, Buddhist founder of Indian logic
- Dionysius Exiguus (approximate date)
- Fridolin of Säckingen Irish missionary
- Vedast, Frankish bishop
- Vitiges, king of the Ostrogoths
- Yifu, empress of Western Wei (b. 510)
- Yujiulü, empress of Western Wei (b. 525)

541

- Adhurgunbadh, Persian general
- John Tzibus, Byzantine governor-merchant in Lazica
- Eraric, king of the Ostrogoths
- Ildibad, king of the Ostrogoths

542

- August 27 – Caesarius, bishop of Arles
- Eógan Bél, king of Connacht (Ireland)

543

- Octa, king of Kent (approximate date) (b. 500)
- Adolius, Byzantine officer
- John the Prophet, Palestinian hermit and Desert Father
- Seridus of Gaza, Palestinian abbot

544

- October 18 – Wenna, Cornish saint (approximate date)
- Dionysius Exiguus, inventor of the Anno Domini era (approximate date)
- Solomon, Byzantine general and prefect of Africa

545

- June 3 – Clotilde, Christian wife of Clovis I and ancestress of the succeeding Merovingian dynasty (b.474)
- October 12 – Mobhí Clárainech, Irish abbot and saint
- Stotzas, Byzantine rebel leader
- Approximate date
  - Budic II, king of Brittany
  - Laurence, bishop of Sipontum
  - Medardus, bishop of Vermandois

546

- Walthari, king of the Lombards

547

- February 10 – Scholastica, Christian nun
- March 21 – Saint Benedict, Patron Saint of Europe, twin brother of St Scholastica, famous for building the Monastery of Mt Cassino and for his Benedictine Monastic Rule
- Gao Huan, general of Northern Wei (b. 496)
- Maelgwn Hir ap Cadwallon, king of Gwynedd (traditional date)
- Theudebert I, king of Austrasia (or 548)
- Tribonian, Byzantine jurist and author of the Codex Justinianus

548

- April 13 – Lý Nam Đế, emperor of Vietnam
- June 28 – Theodora I, Byzantine Empress
- Carcasan, king of the Ifuraces (Algeria)
- Chen Daoten, father of Xuan Di (or 549)
- Theudebert I, king of Austrasia (or 547)
- Theudis, king of the Visigoths

549

- January – Ailill Inbanda, king of Connacht (Ireland) (killed in battle)
- February 16 – Zhu Yi, official of the Liang dynasty (b. 483)
- December 12 – Finnian of Clonard, Irish monastic saint (b. 470)
- exact date unknown
  - Ciarán of Clonmacnoise, Irish monastic saint
  - Gao Cheng, official and regent of Eastern Wei (b. 521)
  - Herculanus, bishop of Perugia
  - Theudigisel, king of the Visigoths (assassinated)
  - Túathal Máelgarb, king of Tara (Ireland)
  - Wu Di, emperor of the Liang dynasty (b. 464)
  - Xiao Zhengde, prince of the Liang dynasty
  - Xu Zhaopei, princess of the Liang dynasty
