= Siege of Archaeopolis (551) =

Siege during the Lazic War

- Part of the Lazic War
- Map of Lazica in Late Antiquity
Date	551
Location	Archaeopolis, Lazica 42°21′26″N 42°11′38″E
Result	Byzantine victory

Belligerents
Byzantine Empire	Sasanian Empire

Commanders and leaders
Odonachus; Babas	Mermeroes

Strength
3,000	70,000 (Note: Historian Ilkka Syvänne argues that the figure provided by Procopius is plausible because of the Byzantines' inability to challenge the Persian army directly.)

Casualties and losses
Unknown	4,000 killed

The Siege of Archaeopolis took place in 551, when an army of the Sasanian Empire besieged the city under Byzantine control during the Lazic War.

In 551, a Persian army under Mermeroes was marching to relieve the besieged fortress of Petra in Lazica. However, they arrived late to save Petra. They then advanced toward Archaeopolis. The Byzantine forces were divided and scattered, leaving the passages leading to the city undefended and effectively giving the Persians a free pass. The Persian army consisted of 70,000 men, both cavalry and infantry, as well as elephants that could act as siege towers. Although the Byzantine garrison of 3,000 men was outnumbered, it sallied out of the city through two gates and launched a surprise attack. The attack caught the Persians unprepared and inflicted heavy losses. The Persians retreated but remained in Lazica, where Mermeroes intended to continue his military campaign.

== Background ==
The Lazic War began in 541 when the Sasanian king Khosrow I invaded Lazica, a Byzantine client kingdom, with the support of King Gubazes II, who had turned against Byzantine monopoly trade policies. Seeking access to the Black Sea, Khosrow captured the Byzantine fortress of Petra after a successful siege but withdrew back to his homeland due to Byzantine advances in the south. He subsequently sought to strengthen Persian control by establishing larger garrisons, prompting resistance among the Lazi, who feared losing their independence. In 547, after uncovering a Persian plot to assassinate Gubazes and deport the Lazi, Gubazes renewed his alliance with Byzantium. Emperor Justinian I accepted the offer, and he sent Dagisthaeus with 7,000 Byzantine soldiers and 1,000 Tzani auxiliaries. When the Byzantines besieged Petra in 548/549, Khosrow dispatched a 33,000-strong army under Mermeroes to relieve the fortress in time. The Byzantines lifted the siege before the Persian reinforcements arrived. While Mermeroes reinforced the garrison in Petra, his large army was low in supplies and forced to return to Persian lands.

In 550, the Byzantines besieged Petra again with an army under general Bessas. In response, a Persian army under Mermeroes, consisting of Persians and allied Sabiri Huns, was sent to relieve the city. Most of the Persian army was made up of cavalry, supported by Daylamite infantry and eight elephants that could serve as siege towers. Although the Sabiri had initially contributed 12,000 men, Mermeroes sent 8,000 home, leaving 4,000, because he feared their numbers. The contemporary historian Procopius claims the Persian force exceeded 70,000 men. However, the Persian reinforcements arrived too late to save Petra and were redirected toward Archaeopolis instead.

== Siege ==
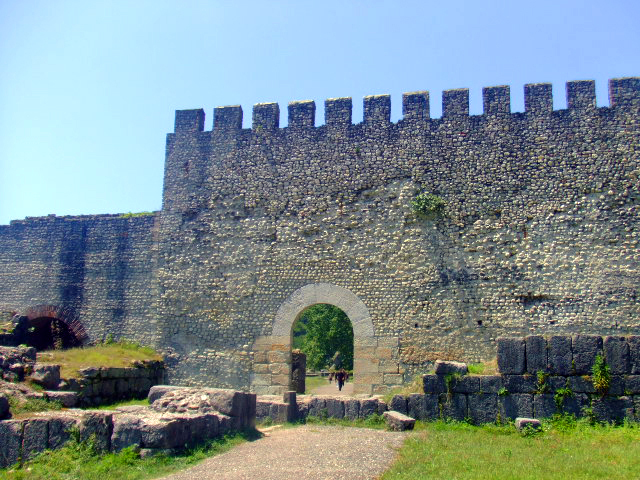
The eastern side of the fortifications of Archaeopolis

The Byzantine forces were divided. Bessas had withdrawn 6,000 men to Pontici in Armenia, leaving the strategically important passes between Lazica and Iberia undefended, which allowed Mermeroes to march uninterrupted. Procopius attributes this decision to Bessas's greed, claiming that he wanted to secure the spoils taken from Petra. Contemporary historian Agathias further accuses him of visiting cities under his control to collect money rather than defend the passes, suggesting that he continued his corrupt practices from his time during the Sack of Rome in 546. The remaining Byzantine forces consisted of 8,200 men under Venilus and Uligagus, supported by 800 Tzani under Varazes the Persarmenian, who guarded the opposite side of the Phasis River. The garrison defending Archaeopolis was 3,000 soldiers under Odonachus and Babas. When Mermeroes learned of the Byzantine forces near the Phasis River, he advanced against them. The Byzantines fled, allowing him to advance towards Archaeopolis.

The Daylamites attacked the steep approaches to Archaeopolis while the remaining forces prepared to use siege rams the Sabiri had constructed. Despite being heavily outnumbered, the Byzantines sallied out of the city through two gates and launched a surprise attack. A small group of Byzantine soldiers stayed behind because a traitor had set fire to the grain storage. The Persians were unprepared because they were scattered, unarmed, or equipped only with bows. At the same time, one of the elephants became enraged and wheeled around, contributing to the confusion. The Persians and their allies retreated. Procopius claims that the Persians lost 4,000 men and three commanders. He also reports that 20,000 Persian horses died from a lack of fodder. The Byzantines captured four standards.

== Aftermath ==
Following the defeat, Mermeroes withdrew to Mocheresis, approximately one day's journey from Archaeopolis. He planned to rebuild the fortress of Cotiaon (also called Cotais or Cotaecon), but a lack of equipment and the arrival of winter prevented him from doing so. Instead, he established his army at Mocheresis and planned to blockade the nearby fortress of Uthimereos, which was defended by a combined Lazi and Byzantine garrison.
