= Battle of Hippis River =

Battle during the Lazic War

- Part of the Lazic War
- Map of Lazica in Late Antiquity
Date	550
Location	Hippis River, Lazica (modern-day Tskhenistsqali River, Georgia)
Result	Byzantine victory

Belligerents
Byzantine Empire; Kingdom of Lazica	Sasanian Empire

Commanders and leaders
Dagisthaeus	Chorianes

Strength
Unknown	30,000

The Battle of Hippis River took place in 550, when an army of the Sasanian Empire fought against the Byzantine forces in Lazica during the Lazic War.

In 550, Persian forces under Chorianes invaded Lazica. A combined Byzantine-Lazi army under Byzantine commander Dagisthaeus and king of Lazica Gubazes II marched to confront them near the Hippis River. Before the battle, minor cavalry skirmishes and a single combat took place, in which a Byzantine soldier was victorious. Once the main armies engaged in combat, the Byzantine cavalry moved to the rear and dismounted, forming a defensive phalanx, because their numbers were not enough to counter the Persian cavalry. This defensive formation successfully resisted Persian attacks, and the combat continued with an exchange of arrows. The battle turned in the Byzantines' favor when an arrow killed Chorianes, causing the Persian army to retreat toward their fortified camp. The Byzantines and Lazi pursued and captured the camp. Despite the victory, Emperor Justinian I dismissed and imprisoned Dagisthaeus because he had earlier failed to capture the fortress of Petra.

== Background ==
The Lazic War began in 541 when the Sasanian king Khosrow I invaded Lazica, a Byzantine client kingdom, with the support of King Gubazes II, who had turned against Byzantine monopoly trade policies. Seeking access to the Black Sea, Khosrow captured the Byzantine fortress of Petra after a successful siege but withdrew back to his homeland due to Byzantine advances in the south. He subsequently sought to strengthen Persian control by establishing larger garrisons, prompting resistance among the Lazi, who feared losing their independence. In 547, after uncovering a Persian plot to assassinate Gubazes and deport the Lazi, Gubazes renewed his alliance with Byzantium. Emperor Justinian I accepted the offer, and he sent Dagisthaeus with 7,000 Byzantine soldiers and 1,000 Tzani auxiliaries. When the Byzantines besieged Petra in 548/549, Khosrow dispatched a 33,000-strong army under Mermeroes to relieve the fortress in time. Dagisthaeus lifted the siege before the Persian reinforcements arrived. While Mermeroes reinforced the garrison in Petra, his large army was low in supplies and forced to return to Persian lands.

In 550, a Persian army of at least 30,000 Persians and Alans, commanded by Chorianes, invaded Lazica. A second Persian force under Nabedes advanced into Abasgia, which had recently revolted against Byzantine rule. At the time, the Byzantines and Persians were negotiating about a potential truce. Historian Ilkka Syvänne considers that these campaigns may have been intended to pressure the Byzantines into negotiating a more favorable peace, or simply to recover lost territory.

== Battle ==
Chorianes established a fortified camp near the Hippis River. The Byzantine-Lazi army under Gubazes and Dagisthaeus camped on the opposite bank and prepared to cross the river. The Lazi demanded to lead the attack, so their cavalry was placed at the front, followed by Byzantine cavalry under Philegagus and John Guzes, with the combined Byzantine and Lazi infantry behind them.

Chorianes deployed a vanguard of 1,000 heavy cavalry as a scouting party. The rest of his army followed, leaving only a few soldiers at the camp. Once the Lazi horsemen saw the Persian vanguard, they moved behind the Byzantine cavalry. Neither side initially engaged in battle. Instead, they made threatening advances to test the mettle of the other side. The situation changed when Artabanes, a Persarmenian serving in the Byzantine army, and two companions challenged the Persians to single combat and defeated them, which caused the Persian vanguard to retreat from their positions and wait for the main Persian army to arrive.

The Byzantine infantry arrived where their cavalry was, and soon the Persian army approached and engaged in melee combat. At this point, the Byzantine cavalry withdrew behind the infantry, and then they dismounted to form a deep phalanx. According to contemporary historian Procopius, they did so because their numbers were insufficient to face the Persian cavalry directly and they doubted the resolve of the Lazi horsemen. Syvänne notes that the phalanx formation was not a single line, but rather an epikampios opisthia formation in which the flanks were vertically oriented, resulting in the whole army having a Π-shape. Moreover, the phalanx formation provided an effective defense against cavalry because the dense ranks of spears and shields frightened the horses and prevented the Persians from breaking through. Both sides attempted to disrupt the formation of the other with arrows. Although Persian archers fired more rapidly, the shields of the defenders stopped most of the arrows. The tide of the battle shifted when an arrow killed Chorianes, causing the Persian army to retreat toward its fortified camp. The Byzantines pursued and captured the Persian camp while the surviving Persians fled.

== Aftermath ==
Another Persian army delivered supplies to the garrison at Petra. Despite the victory at the Hippis River, the Lazi accused Dagisthaeus of betrayal for abandoning the earlier siege to capture Petra when the Persians were at their weakest point. Justinian dismissed and imprisoned Dagisthaeus. His successor Bessas led the Byzantines in besieging Petra later in that year, capturing it after a year-long siege.
