= Losorion =

- Location within Georgia
- 41°39′48″N 41°40′57″E
- Type: Fortification
- Periods: Late Antiquity
- Location: Lazica (Batumi, Adjara, Georgia
- Region: South Caucasus
- Part of: Eastern Roman Empire

History
- Event: Lazic War

Losorion or Lysiris (Ancient Greek: Λοσόριον), was a Byzantine (Roman) fortification on the eastern Black Sea coast, in Lazica in what is now Batumi, western Georgia. In the 6th century, it was constructed by Byzantine emperor Justinian I, and due to its strategic location became a battleground of the 541–562 Lazic War between Rome and Sasanian Persia (Iran). It was identified with the Medieval fortress of Batumi, known as Tamaris Tsikhe, i.e. Queen Tamar's Castle.

Lazica is ours, in which is also the city of the Petraeans, which has taken its civic identity and title from us, using the name of our piety and being called Justiniana. There lie also Archaeopolis and Rhodopolis, very large and ancient forts. With these are also the forts of Scandis and Sarapanis, which we took from the Persians, and Mourisius (Mochiris) and Lysiris (Losorion) and whatever other works we have performed among the Lazi.

— Justinian's Novella 28
