= Fariburz =

- Died: 6th-century
- Military career
- Allegiance: Sasanian Empire
- Branch: Sasanian army
- Conflicts: Lazic War; Rebellion of Anoshazad

Fariburz, known in Byzantine sources as Phabrizus (Greek: Φάβριζος), was a 6th-century Iranian military officer from the Mihran family, who served under the Sasanian king Khosrau I (r. 531–579).

== Biography ==
He was the brother of the diplomat and military officer Izadgushasp. The Byzantine historian Procopius describes them as: "both holding most important offices ... and at the same time reckoned to be the basest of all Persians, having a great reputation for their cleverness and evil ways."

In 548, Fariburz was ordered by Khosrau I to transport the Byzantine prisoners of war captured in the ongoing Lazic War to Iran, where they were to be settled. Some time later, Fariburz, along with another Iranian officer named Pharsanses, at the head of a small army numbering 300, marched to Lazica, where they planned to assassinate the vassal king Gubazes II. However, Pharsanses betrayed the Sasanians and revealed the plan to Gubazes, after which both defected to the Byzantine camp.

Fariburz then instructed the Sasanian garrison of the Lazic fortress of Petra to prepare for a Byzantine siege, and returned to the Sasanian capital of Ctesiphon with his troops. In 549, Fariburz, along with three other commanders and an army numbering 5,000 men, were left in the garrison in Petra by Mihr-Mihroe. However, in a surprise attack, the Byzantine military officer Dagisthaeus and Gubazes managed to defeat Fariburz, who along with the rest of the survivors fled from the country.

In 550, Fariburz suppressed the rebellion of Khosrau's eldest son Anoshazad, and then along with his brother Izadgushasp left Iran on a diplomatic mission to Constantinople. Nothing more is known about Fariburz.

== Sources ==
- Pourshariati, Parvaneh (2008). Decline and Fall of the Sasanian Empire: The Sasanian-Parthian Confederacy and the Arab Conquest of Iran. London, United Kingdom: I.B. Tauris. ISBN 978-1-84511-645-3.
- Martindale, John Robert; Jones, Arnold Hugh Martin; Morris, J., eds. (1992). The Prosopography of the Later Roman Empire, Volume III: A.D. 527–641. Cambridge, United Kingdom: Cambridge University Press. ISBN 978-0-521-20160-5.
- Bury, John Bagnell (1958) [1923]. History of the Later Roman Empire: From the Death of Theodosius I to the Death of Justinian, Volume 2. Mineola, New York: Dover Publications. OCLC 41478187.
- Greatrex, Geoffrey; Lieu, Samuel N. C. (2002). The Roman Eastern Frontier and the Persian Wars (Part II, 363–630 AD). London, United Kingdom: Routledge. ISBN 0-415-14687-9.
