= Siege of Petra (549) =

Siege during the Lazic War

- Part of the Lazic War
- Map of Lazica in Late Antiquity
Date	548/549
Location	Petra, Lazica 41°46′06″N 41°45′12″E
Result	Byzantine defeat

Belligerents
Byzantine Empire	Sasanian Empire

Commanders and leaders
Dagisthaeus; John Gouzes (WIA); Gubazes II of Lazica	Mirranes; Mermeroes

Strength
8,000	1,500 (garrison); 33,000 (relief force)

Casualties and losses
Unknown	Garrison: 1,000 killed; 350 wounded

The Siege of Petra took place in 548/549, (Note: Historians J. B. Bury and Ilkka Syvänne have the siege taking place in 549, while Geoffrey Greatrex and Peter Heather in 548.) when Byzantine forces besieged the fortress of Petra in Lazica, defended by a Sasanian garrison dueing the Lazic War.

The Sasanian king Khosrow I sought to depose the king of Lazica, Gubazes II, by assassination, to expand his influence in the Black Sea region. Gubazes was informed of the plot, prompting him to switch his allegiance to the Byzantines. Emperor Justinian I accepted Gubazes's offer and dispatched an army under Dagisthaeus to capture Petra.

The Byzantine army damaged Petra's fortifications through mining operations, and their archers decimated the defenders. However, the defenders continued to repel Byzantine assaults. The siege ended because Khosrow had sent a relief army under Mermeroes, forcing Dagisthaeus to withdraw after failing to block its path. Despite this setback, the Byzantines and their Lazi allies subsequently defeated Sasanian forces in the region, setting the stage for the Byzantine capture of Petra after a year-long siege in 551.

== Background ==
The Lazic War began when the Sasanian king Khosrow I invaded Lazica with the support of its king, Gubazes II, who shifted his allegiance due to the Byzantine monopoly practices under Emperor Justinian I. Khosrow sought to gain access to the Black Sea. He and Gubazes laid siege to the Byzantine-held fortress of Petra in 541. Despite initial setbacks, the Sasanian forces breached its defenses by undermining one of its stone towers. The remaining defenders surrendered and joined the Sasanian army. Khosrow did not pursue his advantage at Lazica because the Byzantines were advancing in the south, forcing him to return to his homelands.

Khosrow wanted to expand his authority over the client kingdom of Lazica by installing larger Sasanian garrisons and building a fleet to challenge Byzantine supremacy in the Black Sea. However, the Lazi resisted Sasanian expansion by making overtures to the Byzantines. At the same time, the Lazi grew frustrated by their recent change of allegiance, as it restricted their Black Sea trade network. In 547, the Sasanians plotted to assassinate Gubazes and deport all the Lazi from the region. They trusted this task to a native Lazi; however, he revealed the plot to Gubazes, who shifted his allegiance to the Byzantines. Justinian accepted the offer of alliance and dispatched magister militum per Armeniam Dagisthaeus with 7,000 soldiers and 1,000 Tzani auxiliaries to support Gubazes. In response to the Byzantines besieging Petra in 548/549, Khosrow sent an army of 33,000 infantry and cavalry under Mermeroes to provide relief.

== Siege ==
Dagisthaeus laid siege to Petra, which had a garrison of 1500 Sasanians. Byzantine archery was effective during the siege by suppressing the defenders. Repeated arrow fire allowed the sappers to safely approach the walls of Petra. By the end of the siege, archery had resulted in approximately 1,000 kills and 350 wounded. The defenders kept all the corpses inside the fortification to avoid boosting Byzantine morale. Despite the Byzantines' numerical superiority, the defenders resisted the assaults. According to contemporary historian Procopius, the Sasanian garrison made a "display of valour such as no others known to us have made".

The Byzantines initiated mining operations and destroyed part of the wall. However, it was not useful because a building blocked the passage into the city. The Byzantines continued their effort to breach the wall in another location. At this point, Dagisthaeus wrote to Justinian that the city would soon fall and expected rewards for the upcoming accomplishment. The Byzantines weakened a section of the foundations and set it on fire, causing part of the wall to collapse. Fifty soldiers, led by the Armenian commander John Gouzes, entered the fortress. However, John was wounded early on, and his men withdrew due to lack of support. The Sasanian garrison leader Mirranes feared defeat and negotiated with Dagisthaeus, promising to surrender the city soon, convincing Dagisthaeus to delay the next attack.

Anticipating the enemy's arrival, Gubazes urged Dagisthaeus to secure the strategic passes along the Phasis River (south from Petra) while he guarded the northern pass near Iberia. He also secured the support of the Alans and Sabirs by promising them payment from Justinian, which arrived late but enabled them to launch a diversionary attack against Iberia to distract the Sasanians. Meanwhile, Dagisthaeus sent 100 men to guard the pass, but they were too few to block the advancement of the much larger Sasanian forces. Dagisthaeus withdrew before Sasanian reinforcements arrived at Petra.

== Aftermath ==
Lacking enough supplies for his army, Mermeroes hastily repaired the fallen portion of Petra's wall with linen bags filled with sand, garrisoned the fortress with 3,000 men. He also left 5,000 men under Fariburz in Colchis to supply the garrison, and himself headed for Persarmenia with the rest of the army.

The combined Byzantine-Lazi force, numbering 14,000, defeated Fariburz in a surprise attack, capturing the supplies brought from Iberia by Mermeroes for Petra. Another force under Chorianes was also defeated at the Battle of Hippis River after the latter was killed in action. Dagisthaeus was later stripped of his command for alleged poor leadership in Petra and replaced by Bessas. The Byzantines captured Petra at the Siege of Petra (550–551).
