= Siege of Petra (550–551) =

Battle during the Roman–Persian Wars

- Part of the Lazic War
Date	Summer 550 – spring of 551 AD
Location	Petra, Lazica 41°46′06″N 41°45′12″E
Result	Byzantine victory

Belligerents
Byzantine Empire; Sabirs; Lazica	Sasanian Empire

Commanders and leaders
Bessas (WIA)	Unknown

Strength
6,000	2,300

Casualties and losses
Most of the force killed or wounded	Entire force: 1,570 killed; 730 captured, 712 of whom were wounded

The siege of Petra was fought in 550 AD, between the Byzantines (East Romans) under general Bessas, and the Sasanian Persian garrison of Petra in the buffer state of Lazica. The strategic fortress had previously been held by the Byzantines before it was seized in 541 by the Sasanian king Khosrow I, and his Lazi allies. This conquest gave the Sassanian Empire access to the Black Sea and marked the beginning of the Lazic War. After a failed attempt to recapture Petra in 549, the Byzantine emperor Justinian I sent an army under Bessas to retake the fortress. The Byzantine historian Procopius described the resulting siege in vivid detail.

The initial mining operations that were undertaken by the besiegers against the fort walls were ineffective. Based on advice from the Sabirs, their nomadic allies, the Byzantines constructed a type of lightweight battering ram that could be deployed on the sloped plain leading to the walls. The defenders responded by throwing incendiary bombs; however, a part of the wall was successfully damaged in the attempt. Bessas and his men attempted to scale the weakened wall twice, resulting in fierce fighting and heavy casualties. A second part of the wall also collapsed, causing both sides to divide their men. The Byzantines gained the advantage due to their numeric superiority. During the fighting, the wooden tower from which the defenders were frantically throwing their bombs accidentally caught on fire, causing the Sasanian defense to collapse. The wounded were captured; however, the remainder preferred to fight to the death rather than surrender, and retreated to the high citadel, which the Byzantines torched. In the end, casualties were high, with virtually all men on both sides either killed or wounded. After the victory, Bessas demolished the fort walls. A large Sasanian relief force failed to arrive in time and instead shifted its focus to action elsewhere in Lazica. Bessas retreated westward and avoided further military action.

== Sources ==
The siege is described by the Byzantine historian Procopius in vivid detail. As a siege description, this narration is unique in his Persian Wars: in descriptions of other sieges, the focus is on the role of God, while in the siege of Petra (at least the first phase) the focus is on intelligence, innovation, technology, and later on heroism. The narration includes elements previously unseen in Procopian battles.

== Background ==
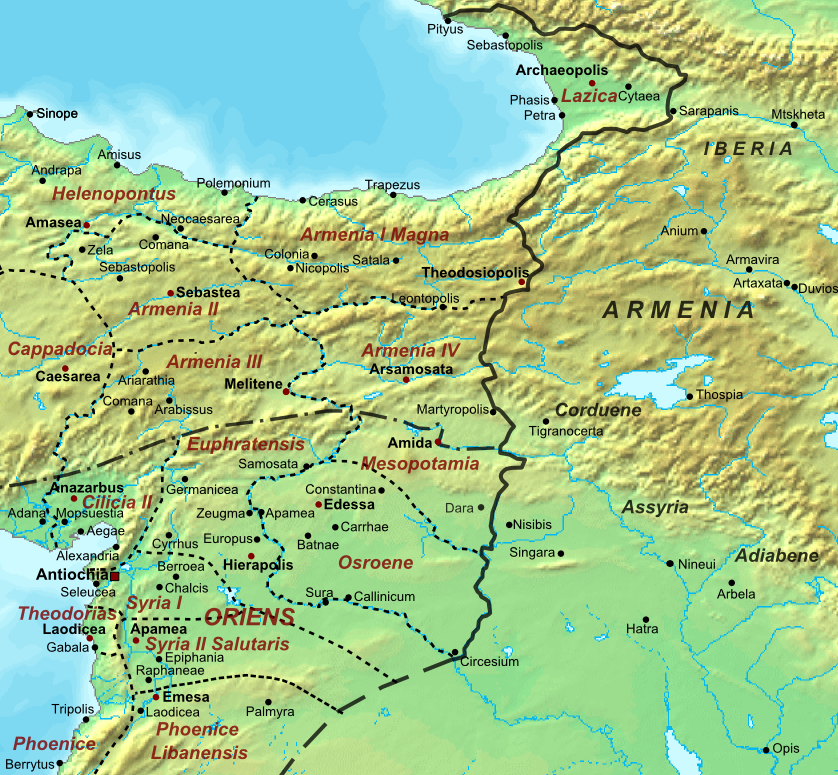
Map of the Byzantine–Sasanian frontier in 565. In 541 AD, the small but strategic region of Lazica became the new battlefield of the Roman–Persian Wars.

In 541 AD, the Sasanian King of Kings Khosrow I led a campaign to dominate the strategic country of Lazica on the eastern shore of the Black Sea with the aid of the Lazic king Gubazes II, who had been alienated by the Byzantines under magister militum per Armeniam John Tzibus. Since the latter had concentrated his forces in the port city of Petra, capturing this city was the main objective of the Sasanians. After an unsuccessful attempt to break the gate, the Sasanians managed to destroy a tower through mining and breach the fort, forcing the Byzantine garrison to capitulate. Thus, a Sasanian garrison was established in Petra. This assault marked the beginning of the Lazic War.

Map of Lazica. Petra was situated on the Black Sea coast.

The new Byzantine magister militum per Armeniam Dagisthaeus laid siege to Petra in 549, after Gubazes switched his allegiance to the Byzantines. The Sasanian garrison took heavy casualties, but a large Sasanian relief force under Mermeroes forced the Byzantines to withdraw. The Sasanian general restored the damaged walls of Petra and garrisoned the fort with 3,000 fresh soldiers. Further conflicts occurred, but the strategic fort still remained in Sasanian hands. In 550, the Byzantine emperor Justinian I replaced Dagisthaeus with Bessas, an aged veteran with an inglorious record after the sack of Rome in 546. At the same time, further Byzantine reinforcements were sent to Lazica. After taking command, Bessas dispatched an army against the rebellious Abasgi tribe and proceeded to lay siege to Petra.

While Bessas began the assault, the five-year truce of 545 had already expired in April 550 and Khosrow's envoy, Izad Gushnasp, was negotiating in Constantinople.

== Siege ==
After the failed Byzantine siege in 549, the Sasanians garrisoned Petra with a fresh 3,000-strong force and filled the breaches in the foundation of the walls with sandbags covered with thick planed beams as the foundation of a new wall. The number of the installed garrison was 3,000 in 549, but in 550 it was 2,600 or 2,300 (according to Peterson); the rest were probably assigned to lesser fortifications or were busied with duties outside the fort such as foraging, scouting, or escorting. The garrison were "brave and resolute", according to Procopius. The garrison was very well-supplied with arms, and foodstuffs, and received a water supply through hidden aqueduct pipes.

=== First phase ===
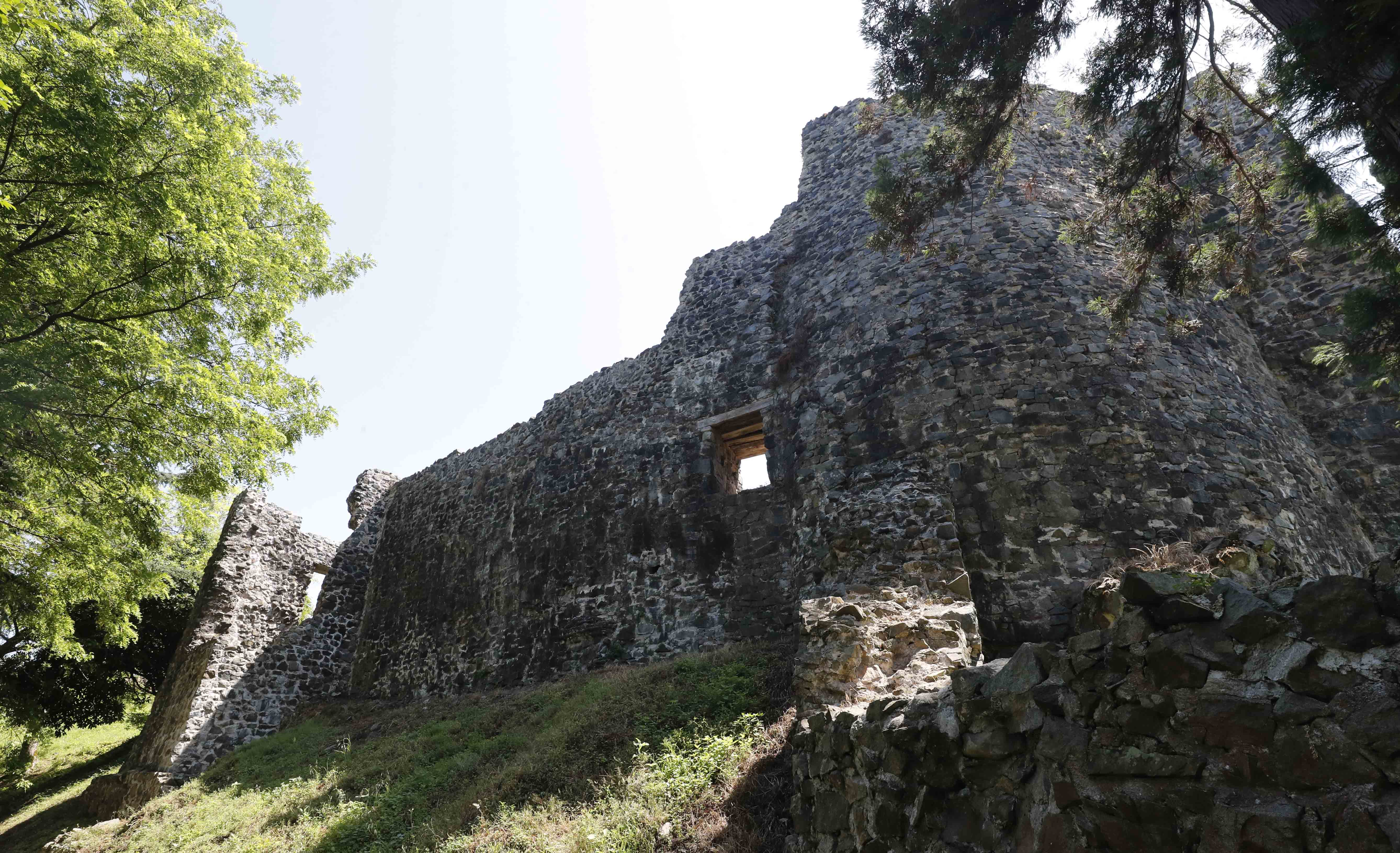
Ruins of a wall and towers of Petra

Bessas commenced the siege of Petra in 550, with an army of 6,000. Similar to the previous siege by Dagisthaeus in 549, Bessas began mining operations against a large section of the wall that was partly damaged during the previous siege. When repairing the damaged wall, the Sasanians used large, smooth timber beams instead of foundation stones to tie the walls together, so instead of collapsing or tipping over, the undermined part of the wall sank in one piece regularly "as if it were purposely lowered by a machine", and the only effect was that the height of the wall was reduced. The mine was overwhelmed. Using a conventional Roman battering ram was not feasible, because the only way to the walls was through a sloped uphill plane where traditional wheel-mounted rams could not be deployed.

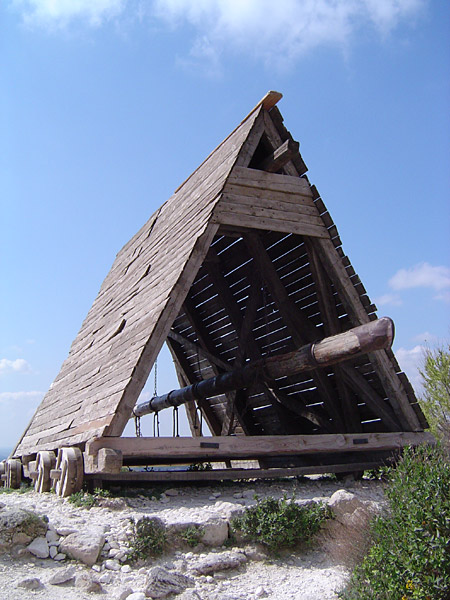
Conventional battering rams were wheel-borne and featured a heavy protective frame, limiting their use to level ground.

At this time a group of nobles of the Sabirs (a warlike nomadic people native to the Caucasus) visited the Byzantine camp in order to receive a sum of money from an envoy of Justinian. Seeing the situation of the Byzantines, the Sabirs revealed to them a simple but ingenious way to batter a wall in sloped places: instead of using beams and wheels which made the frame heavy, they used woven osier twigs covered with hides as the protective frame, making the machine light enough to be carried by forty men on a sloped plane. Each ram was mounted on chains to be swung swifter. Three such rams were constructed, equipped with standard ram-heads from the Byzantine arsenal and operated by a Byzantine crew. Heavily armored sappers equipped with long poles with hooks would accompany each ram and pull down weakened masonry. (Note: The Sasanians asked the same Sabirs to construct similar rams for them during the siege of Archaeopolis (550).)

According to the Byzantine historian Procopius, the Sasanian garrison placed a pre-made wooden "tower" on the wall and from there fully armored men hurled fire pots containing a particular mixture of sulfur, pitch, and naphtha ("oil of Medea") onto the top of the rams. According to Petersen, these men were probably operating a traction trebuchet, and this "wooden tower" that is spoken of by Procopius was a frame that protected pulling crews from enemy fire. The armored men with poles with hooks that accompanied the rams showed another functionality here, as they quickly pulled off the flaming projectiles from the roof of their machines to prevent serious damage. The incendiary weapon acted like a "modern napalm".

A breach was eventually made in the wall by the battering rams, and after a short speech, Bessas led his men to scale the sunken wall with ladders while Byzantine archers shot arrows into the fort. Despite being obese and over seventy years old, Bessas himself participated in the escalade, too. Procopius said of the battle:

There a battle took place and a display of valor by both Romans and Persians such as I at least believe has never once been seen in these times. For while the number of the barbarians amounted to two thousand three hundred, the Romans counted as many as six thousand. And practically all those on both sides who were not killed received wounds...

Many of the Byzantine attackers fell to the ground. Bessas fell too, but before the Sasanians could shoot him with arrows, his guards (doryphoroi) formed a testudo around him, and as he ordered, dragged him by the leg to a safe place, as he was both old and obese. Bessas then made a second charge which greatly inspired his men. The Sasanians declared themselves ready to capitulate and asked for some time, but since both sides were still fighting, Bessas did not trust them and refused to stop the assault. A second part of the wall collapsed as a result of the earlier failed mining attempt, forcing both sides to divide their forces. The Byzantines gradually gained the upper hand in the ensuing conflict due to their numerical superiority. A certain John the Armenian, together with a few other Armenians managed to climb up a precipice overlooking the battlements and enter the fort; but apparently, this was a formulated trap that resulted in their deaths in the resulting melee.

While the battering rams were operating and the Sasanians in their wooden tower were frantically hurling fire pots at them, a gale-force south wind suddenly blew and set part of the wooden tower alight. The fire gradually spread by naphtha leakage and finally consumed the whole wooden structure together with the armored men inside it, the charred bodies of whom fell over the attackers and the defenders. This turned the tide of the battle. The Sasanian resistance collapsed and the Byzantines exploited the confusion and finally managed to breach the fortress. At this stage, nearly half of the Sasanians had already been killed. 730 men from the garrison were taken as prisoners, all of whom except 18 were wounded. The prisoners were sent to the Byzantine emperor in Constantinople. The other 500 retreated back to a small acropolis or high citadel. Many of "the best of the Romans" were killed too, including John the Armenian.

=== Second phase ===
The next day, the 500 Sasanian forces who had shut themselves in the acropolis refused to negotiate, in spite of an offer of capitulation, preferring instead a heroic death. Bessas pressed on negotiation by sending a soldier to the wall to persuade the defenders by an exhortation, making references to Christian pity, but the Sasanians remained silent. He resorted to force by torching the citadel by means of throwing incendiary materials, hoping that the Sasanians would leave it, but, surprisingly, they remained and perished in the flames.

Then it appeared how dear Lazica was to Chosroes, in that he had sent the most excellent of all his soldiers to garrison Petra.

— Procopius

At the beginning of the siege, the Byzantines had destroyed the aqueduct. During the siege, a prisoner revealed that there was another pipe beneath the visible one, concealed by the earth, which the attackers destroyed too. After the siege was complete, the Byzantines found out that the fort still had access to water. It was then revealed that still a third pipe was concealed deep below the second pipe.

Thus, Petra fell in March or April, 550. A large amount of Sasanian supplies and equipment were captured, showing the importance of this fort to the Sasanians. Bessas then razed the fort walls to the ground, an act commended by Emperor Justinian.

== Aftermath ==
With the capture and subsequent destruction of Petra, Khosrow's scheme to challenge the Byzantine hegemony in the Black Sea was foiled. A relief force under Mermeroes consisting mostly of cavalry and eight elephants was on their way to yet again relieve Petra, but they did not arrive in time, only receiving the news of its fall in the spring of 551. But if the Sasanians could not have the Black Sea coast, they can at least seize the lion's share of Lazica. Thus, Mermeroes pivoted by immediately shifting focus to dominate eastern Lazica and its dependencies, Suania, and Scymnia. This was achieved by the swift capture of the Byzantine forts Sarapanis and Scanda. He also made an unsuccessful attempt to capture Archaeopolis, the capital city and the main Byzantine stronghold in Lazica. This change of focus set the tone for the next five years of the Lazic War.

Meanwhile, Bessas retired west to Pontica and busied himself with its administration. The Byzantine forces in Lazica withdrew west to the mouth of the Phasis, while the Lazi, including their king Gubazes and his family, sought refuge in the mountains. The success at Petra salvaged Bessas' reputation as a general, but as a result of subsequent setbacks, he was dismissed and exiled.
