= Domninus (general) =

6th-century Byzantine general

Domninus (Δομνῖνος) was a 6th century Byzantine military general of Egyptian origin who served during the reign of Justinian I (r. 527–565). He is attested for his participation in the Lazic War against the Sasanian Empire in the Caucasus region.

== Biography ==
Domninus was Egyptian by birth; details of his early life and family are limited. His career illustrates the integration of native Egyptians into the senior officer corps of the Roman and Byzantine military.

He is mentioned by the court historian Agathias, who records that Domninus commanded cavalry units during the Lazic War in the Caucasus. The war, a protracted conflict between the Byzantine and Sasanian empires over the strategic region of Lazica (modern-day western Georgia), saw extensive fighting throughout the 550s. Agathias's mention places Domninus within this theater, though the exact dates of his service are not detailed in surviving texts.

== Significance ==
Domninus illustrates the social and military dynamics of the 6th-century Byzantine Empire. His Egyptian origin and rank as a cavalry commander show that individuals from the province of Egypt could attain positions of military responsibility far from their homeland. He is among several identifiable native Egyptians, such as the generals Saint Menas and Calonymus of Alexandria, who reached middle and upper echelons of the Byzantine army.
