= Tzath I of Lazica =

Tzath I წათე I
- King of Lazica
- Reign: c. 522 – after 527
- Predecessor: Damnazes
- Successor: Opsites

Tzath I (Georgian: წათე), Tzathius or Tzathios (Greek: Τζάθιος) in Byzantine sources, was king of Lazica (western Georgia) from 521/522 to an unknown date. He rejected Sassanid Persian overlordship and turned to the Byzantine emperor Justin I (r. 518–527) for aid. He was the first Christian king of Lazica.

Tzath was the son of Damnazes, of whom almost nothing is known. Upon his father's death, in 521 or 522, he refused to recognize the traditional suzerainty exercised by the Persian ruler over Lazica, rejected Zoroastrianism, and instead turned to the Byzantine Empire. He went to Constantinople, where he was received by Emperor Justin I, baptized as a Christian, and wedded to a noble wife, Valeriana. After having received the insignia and royal robes that signified both his royal status and his submission to the Byzantine emperor, he returned to Lazica.

Tzath is mentioned for the last time with the outbreak of the Iberian War in 527, when Lazica was attacked by the Persians, who had easily overrun the rebellious Iberians. He sent for aid to Emperor Justinian I (r. 527–565), who had just succeeded his uncle Justin. Justinian responded by sending an army, which allowed Lazica to resist the Persians successfully.

Professor Cyril Toumanoff has conjectured that Tzath's reign lasted until circa 540, when he was succeeded by his possible son, Gubazes II. Opsites, an uncle of Gubazes, is mentioned by the 6th-century Byzantine historian Procopius as "king of the Lazi" on one occasion and as prince of east Abasgia on the other. If indeed a king, Opsites's reign may well be placed between those of Tzath and Gubazes. Toumanoff, however, further assumes that Opsites was a member of the Lazic royal family and prince of Abasgia, but never a king of Lazica, thus making Gubazes a direct successor of Tzath I.

== Sources ==
- Greatrex, Geoffrey; Lieu, Samuel N. C. (2002). The Roman Eastern Frontier and the Persian Wars (Part II, 363–630 AD). London, United Kingdom: Routledge. ISBN 0-415-14687-9.
- Martindale, John Robert; Jones, Arnold Hugh Martin; Morris, J., eds. (1980). The Prosopography of the Later Roman Empire, Volume II: A.D. 395–527. Cambridge, United Kingdom: Cambridge University Press. ISBN 978-0-521-20159-9.
- Odisheli, Manana (2018). "Tsathes I". In Nicholson, Oliver (ed.). The Oxford Dictionary of Late Antiquity. Oxford: Oxford University Press. ISBN 978-0-19-866277-8.
- Toumanoff, Cyril (1980). "How Many Kings Named Opsites?". In Coddington, John Insley; Thompson, Neil D.; Anderson, Robert Charles (eds.). A Tribute to John Insley Coddington on the Occasion of the Fortieth Anniversary of the American Society of Genealogists. Association for the Promotion of Scholarship in Genealogy.

Preceded by Damnazes	King of Lazica; 521/522 – after 527	Succeeded by Gubazes II ?
