= Pacorus of the Lazi =

Pacorus was a 2nd-century king of the Lazi, a people in Colchis. His appointment to kingship by the Roman Emperor Antoninus Pius (r. 138–161) is mentioned in the Historia Augusta, possibly written in the 4th century, immediately after reporting a visit to Rome by Pharasmanes, king of Iberia. Pacorus' accession might have marked the beginning of ascendancy of the Lazi in Colchis and solidification of a centralized Lazic kingdom.

The name Pacorus is the Latin form of the Greek Pakoros (Πακώρος), itself a variant of the Middle Iranian Pakur, derived from Old Iranian bag-puhr ('son of a god'). The name "Bakur" is the Georgian (ბაკურ) and Armenian (Բակուր) attestation of Middle Iranian Pakur.

Pacorus is identified by the Georgian scholars Tedo Dondua and Akaki Chikobava with the "king Pacuros" of a Greek inscription on a silver cup found by a team of Russian archaeologists in a grave at Achmarda, in north Abkhazia, in 2005. The text conveys an Oriental-style royal message: "I, Pacuros, the king, gave to [my] sheep," apparently addressed to the king's subjects living in the area.
