= Anoshazad =

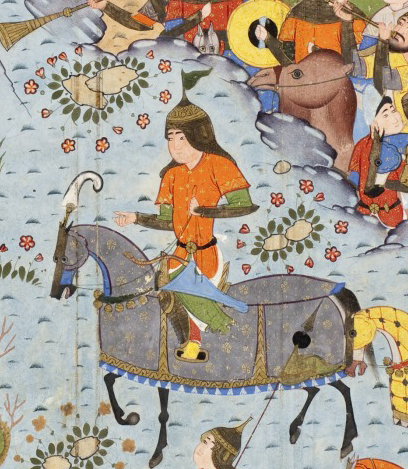
16th-century Shahnameh illustration of Anoshazad.

Anōshazād, (Note: Also spelled Anushzad or Anush-Zad.) known in the Shahnameh as Nōshzād (Persian: نوشزاد), was a Sasanian prince who led a revolt in the southwestern province of Khuzistan in the 540s. He was the oldest son of King Khosrow I (r. 531–579), while his mother was a Christian and the daughter of the judge (dadwar) of Ray. He may have attempted to receive the support of the Christians of Iran in his revolt. In the view of one historian, his revolt represented an unsuccessful attempt by the Christian elites of Khuzistan to increase their political power and status.

== Etymology ==
Anōshazād is a Middle Persian name meaning "son of the immortal". Nōshzād (نوشزاد) is the New Persian form, while the Greek form of the name, found in Procopius's history, is Anasozados.

== Biography ==
The main sources for Anoshazad's life are Abu Hanifa Dinawari (9th century), Ferdowsi's Shahnameh (10th–11th centuries), and the Byzantine historian Procopius (6th century). Ibn al-Athir's (12th–13th centuries) and Mirkhvand's (15th century) works contain summaries of Ferdowsi's version. These sources mostly agree with one another about Anoshazad but contain some key differences.

Anoshazad was the eldest son of the Sasanian king Khosrow I (r. 531–579). Ibn al-Athir identifies Anoshazad's mother as the daughter of the judge (dadwar) of Ray. According to Dinawari and Ferdowsi, (Note: Per Michael R. Jackson Bonner, Dinawari states that Anoshazad and his father followed different religions and merely implies that Anoshazad was a Christian, while Ferdowsi states it directly.) Anoshazad's mother was a Christian, and he adopted her faith, causing Khosrow to imprison him in Gundeshapur. Procopius does not describe Anoshazad as a Christian and instead reports that the cause for the punishment was his seduction some of Khosrow's wives. Per Ibn al-Athir, Anoshazad was thought to be a secret follower of Manichaeism, regarded as a heresy by the Sasanian state.

Map of Khuzistan and its surroundings.

According to Dinawari, while Khosrow I was campaigning in Syria against the Byzantines, he fell ill at Emesa. According to orientalist Theodor Nöldeke, however, Khosrow never reached the city and instead returned to his capital, Ctesiphon. False rumours were spread (by Anoshazad or others, depending on the source) that Khosrow had a deadly sickness. Anoshazad thereafter raised an army, which consisted of prisoners and Christians from Hormizd-Ardashir (Ahvaz) and Gundeshapur. Scholar Djalal Khaleghi-Motlagh writes that Anoshazad most likely heard rumours of his father's death and attempted to take power. In Nöldeke's view, Anoshazad's supposed Christianity was not a significant part of his revolt, although he may have emphasized his mother's Christian faith in order to get support from a large number of Christians, probably unsuccessfully. (Note: Historian Richard E. Payne writes that Anoshazad "reportedly converted to Christianity, or at least presented himself as a Christian to gain the confidence of the inhabitants of towns and cities such as Beit Lapat / Jundishapur.") (Note: Per J. Labourt, Khosrow successfully enlisted the help of the bishop Mar Aba, previously imprisoned, to prevent Christians from going over to Anoshazad's side. In Jackson Bonner's view, this report, found in the Chronicle of Seert, was an attempt to deny any involvement in the revolt by the Church in Iran.) Nevertheless, he managed to capture Ahvaz and seize its riches. Anoshazad is said to have written a letter to the Byzantine emperor, and according to Procopius, news of the revolt prompted Emperor Justinian to order an invasion of Iran, which was soon aborted after a Roman defeat in Armenia.

Khosrow's vice-regent at Ctesiphon, called Burzin by Ferdowsi, shortly sent an army to besiege Gundeshapur and informed Khosrow of the revolt. (Note: Alternatively, as stated by Dinawari, Anoshazad's army marched in the direction of Iraq after taking Ahvaz.) According to Procopius, the leader of the army sent against the rebels was Fariburz. Khosrow thereafter ordered the vice-regent to bring Anoshazad back alive if possible, and to kill all the nobles participating in his revolt, but not the ordinary people. The revolt of Anoshazad was eventually suppressed, while he was captured and taken to Ctesiphon, where he was blinded. Ferdowsi's gives an account of Anoshazad's death in battle which Nöldeke considered "poetic fantasy", but which Michael R. Jackson Bonner regards as very likely adapted from a Christian hagiography of the prince. In historian Richard E. Payne's view, Anoshazad's revolt represented an unprecedented and unsuccessful attempt by the Christian elites of the cities of Khuzistan to claim the aristocratic right of rebellion and place their own candidate on the throne. Per Bonner, the revolt created the lasting expectation among Iranian Christians that a Christian would eventually take power in the Sasanian Empire.

== Sources ==
- Bonner, Michael R. Jackson (2020). The Last Empire of Iran. Gorgias Handbooks. Piscataway, N.J.: Gorgias Press. ISBN 978-1-4632-0616-1.
- Khaleghi-Motlagh, Djalal (1985). "Anōšazād". In Yarshater, Ehsan (ed.). Encyclopædia Iranica. Vol. II/1: Anāmaka–Anthropology (Online ed.). Encyclopædia Iranica Foundation. pp. 99–100.
- Martindale, John Robert; Jones, Arnold Hugh Martin; Morris, J., eds. (1992). The Prosopography of the Later Roman Empire, Volume III: A.D. 527–641. Cambridge, United Kingdom: Cambridge University Press. ISBN 978-0-521-20160-5.
- Payne, Richard E. (2015). A State of Mixture: Christians, Zoroastrians, and Iranian Political Culture in Late Antiquity. Univ of California Press. ISBN 9780520961531.
