= Dagistheus =

Dagistheus (fl. 479) was an Ostrogothic chieftain. The name is Germanic. Theodoric the Great (r. 474–526) sent Dagistheus and Soas as hostages to Adamantius in Epirus in 479. He was presumably a leading Ostrogothic chieftain under Theodoric. The Roman baths in Constantinople were possibly named after him. He may have been an ancestor of the later Byzantine general Dagisthaeus.

== Sources ==
- Jones, Arnold Hugh Martin; Martindale, John Robert; Morris, J. (1980). The Prosopography of the Later Roman Empire. Cambridge University Press. pp. 341–. ISBN 978-0-521-20159-9.
