= Tzath II of Lazica =

Tzath II წათე II
- King of Lazica
- Reign: 556 – unknown
- Predecessor: Gubazes II

Tzath II (Georgian: წათე II) was King of Lazica as a Byzantine client from 556 to an unknown date.

He was the younger brother of Gubazes II, who was assassinated by Byzantine generals in autumn 555. At the time, Tzath resided at the Byzantine capital, Constantinople. The Lazi sent a delegation to the Byzantine emperor Justinian I (r. 527–565) to request both justice for their murdered king and the confirmation of Tzath as their new king (the Lazic rulers, as client kings, had to have their accession confirmed by the emperor, who awarded them with their regalia). Tzath arrived in Lazica in spring 556, accompanied by the magister militum Soterichus, and was received in an elaborately staged welcome ceremony. Nothing further is known of him.

Tzath II is the last known ruler of the dynasty of the kings of Lazica. After the Byzantine–Iranian treaty of 561/562, that ended the Lazic War, Lazica gradually disappears from the sources.

== Sources ==
- Bury, John Bagnell (1958) [1923]. History of the Later Roman Empire: From the Death of Theodosius I to the Death of Justinian, Volume 2. Mineola, New York: Dover Publications. OCLC 41478187.
- Greatrex, Geoffrey; Lieu, Samuel N. C. (2002). The Roman Eastern Frontier and the Persian Wars (Part II, 363–630 AD). Routledge. ISBN 0-415-14687-9.
- Martindale, John R., ed. (1992). The Prosopography of the Later Roman Empire: Volume III, AD 527–641. Cambridge: Cambridge University Press. ISBN 0-521-20160-8.
- Toumanoff, Cyril (1963). Studies in Christian Caucasian History, p. 269. Georgetown University Press.

Preceded by Gubazes II	King of Lazica; 556 – unknown	Unknown Title next held by Barnuk I
