= Sergius, Patrician of Lazica =

Sergius, son of Barnucius, was a ruler (patrician) of Lazica on the eastern Black Sea, in what is now western Georgia, who, c. 696/697, revolted from the Byzantine hegemony and acknowledged the suzerainty of the Arabs. Sergius' defection during the Arab–Byzantine wars is reported by Theophilus of Edessa and Agapius of Hierapolis.

== Genealogy ==
A name of Sergius' father, Barnucius, is another rendering of the same name as Lebarnicius, a patrician of Lazica c. 662, known from the Hypomnesticum of Theodore Spudaeus and Theodosius of Gangra. The names of Nebarnukios and of his son Sergios also appear on seals found in the western Caucasus. Professor Cyril Toumanoff considered Lebarnicius as the same person as Barnucius and, thus, father of Sergius, while Pavle Ingoroqva attempted to identify Barnucius with the Baruk of the medieval Georgian chronicle, Divan of the Abkhazian Kings. This view has gained some currency in modern Georgian scholarship (M. Sanadze and T. Beradze), but it is not shared by the likes as Toumanoff and Gloveli. Toumanoff, further, considered both Barnucius and Sergius dynasts of local provenance and possible descendants of the kings of Lazica.
