= Opsites of Lazica =

Map of Lazica and surrounding regions in Late Antiquity

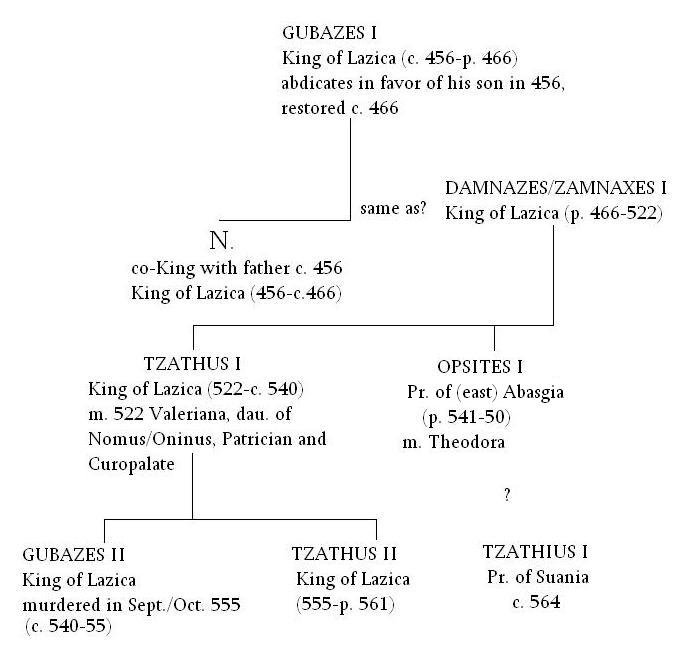
Cyril Toumanoff's tentative reconstruction of the family tree of the kings of Lazica.

Opsites (Georgian: ოფსიტე) is the name twice mentioned by the 6th-century AD Eastern Roman historian Procopius in his De Bellis, while recounting the events related to the Lazic War (541–562) fought between the Eastern Roman and Sassanid Persian empires over the Caucasian state of Lazica.

In one passage, Procopius remarks parenthetically that Opsites was an uncle of Gubazes II of Lazica and at one time king of the Lazi: "[This Persian general]...captured Theodora, the consort of Opsites (he was uncle of Gobazes and king of the Lazi), finding her among the Apsilii, and carried her off to the land of the Persians. Now this woman happened to be a Roman by birth, for the kings of the Lazi from ancient times had been sending to Byzantium, and, with the consent of the emperor, arranging marriages with some of the senators and taking home their wives from there"

He was married to Theodora, of Roman senatorial descent. At the time of the Lazic revolt against Rome, Theodora, while living among the Apsilii, was captured, by chance, by the Persian commander Nabedes and carried off to Persia.

Later in Procopius's work, Opsites appears as ruler of the eastern part of Abasgia, a land north of Lazica (the west was under Sceparnas). He was installed after the Abasgians rejected East Roman rule circa 550. Opsites led the Abasgians against the Romans under John Guzes and Uligagus, who defeated the rebels and captured their fort of Trachea. Opsites fled to the Sabir Huns of the Caucasus but his family members were all captured.

Scholarly opinion is divided as to whether the Opsites of these two passages are the same person and whether Procopius's report of him being king of Lazica is true. If Opsites indeed ruled as king, this might have occurred before 541, when Gubazes II was king. Professor Cyril Toumanoff assumes that, in both cases, Procopius refers to the same person, a member of the Lazic royal family, who became an Abasgian leader. In the view of Toumanoff, this is highly probable given the fact that Lazica and Abasgia revolted together against the Roman hegemony and Abasgia had long been under Lazic suzerainty.

== Sources ==
- Martindale, John Robert; Jones, Arnold Hugh Martin; Morris, J., eds. (1992). The Prosopography of the Later Roman Empire. Vol. III: A.D. 527–641. Cambridge, United Kingdom: Cambridge University Press. ISBN 978-0-521-20159-9.
- Toumanoff, Cyril (1980). "How Many Kings Named Opsites?". In Coddington, John Insley; Thompson, Neil D.; Anderson, Robert Charles (eds.). A Tribute to John Insley Coddington on the Occasion of the Fortieth Anniversary of the American Society of Genealogists. Association for the Promotion of Scholarship in Genealogy.
