= Mermeroes =

Persian general

Mihr-Mihroe
- Born: Unknown date Sasanian Empire
- Died: 554; Mtskheta, Iberia
- Burial place: Sky burial outside Mtskheta
- Military career
- Allegiance: Sasanian Empire
- Branch: Sasanian army
- Conflicts: Iberian War; Battle of Satala; Siege of Martyropolis; Lazic War; Siege of Petra; Siege of Archaeopolis; Battle of Telephis–Ollaria

Mermeroes or Mihr-Mihroe (Note: In Middle Persian either Mihr-Mihrōē or Mihrmāh-rōy; in Byzantine sources Mermeroes (Greek: Μερμερόης)) (died 555), was a 6th-century Sasanian (Persian) general who played an active role in the Byzantine–Sassanid Wars of the time. Although he suffered defeats early in his career during the Iberian War, he later led successful campaigns in Lazica during the Lazic War. He provided relief to the Persian fortress of Petra in 549 and captured several strongholds in the region. However, he failed to repeat this during the siege of Petra in 551. Despite his advanced age and physical disabilities, he was a capable military commander and earned high praise from contemporary Byzantine historian Agathias. He died of illness in Mtskheta city in 555.

== Biography ==
Little is known of his early life, but by 555 he is recorded as an old man. He first appears in the summer of 530, during the Iberian War, when he led an army of 30,000 in an invasion of Byzantium's Armenian provinces. However, he was defeated near Satala by the Byzantine generals Sittas and Dorotheus and had to withdraw. In the summer of 531, following the narrow Persian victory at Callinicum and a series of minor reversals in Armenia and northern Mesopotamia, the Persian shah, Kavadh I (r. 488–531), sent Mihr-Mihroe along with Bawi and Kanarang to capture the Byzantine stronghold of Martyropolis. The two commanders laid siege to the city, but after receiving news of Kavadh's death, and with their troops suffering from the cold winter, they concluded a truce and withdrew to Persian territory.

Map of the kingdom of Lazica

In 542, after the renewal of hostilities in 540, Mihr-Mihroe was dispatched by Khosrau I (r. 531–579) against the Byzantine fortress of Dara, but, according to Corippus, he was defeated and captured by the fort's commander, John Troglita. Mihr-Mihroe reappears in 548, when he was sent at the head of a large army to relieve the fortress of Petra in Lazica, which was under siege by a combined Byzantine-Lazic force. As the Byzantine commander, Dagisthaeus, had neglected to safeguard the mountain passes with sufficient men, Mihr-Mihroe was able to move into Lazica, brushing aside the Byzantine detachments. He relieved the siege of Petra and reinforced its garrison, but lacking supplies for his army, he was forced to withdraw to Dvin in Persian Armenia, leaving behind some 3,000 men garrisoning Petra and a further 5,000 under Phabrizus to keep the supply route open.

Phabrizus was attacked in the next year by the Lazi and the Byzantines, but the Persians somehow managed to resupply Petra. The new Byzantine commander, Bessas, laid siege to Petra. In spring 551, Mihr-Mihroe marched with an army of cavalry and eight elephants to relieve the fortress once again, but before he could do this, it fell to Bessas's troops, who dismantled the city walls. He then turned towards the Lazic capital, Archaeopolis, seizing the forts of Sarapanis and Scanda in the process. He laid siege to Archaeopolis, but his attacks were repulsed. As his army suffered from lack of supplies, he was forced to abandon the siege and head west, to the fertile province of Mocheresis, which he made his base of operations. Over the subsequent winter of 551/552, he strengthened his control over eastern Lazica (including the region of Suania), while his peace overtures to the Lazic king Gubazes II (r. 541–555) failed. Reinforced with mercenaries recruited among the Sabirs, in 552 he attacked the Byzantine-Lazic strongholds of Archaeopolis, Tzibile, and a third unnamed fort, but was again repulsed and withdrew to Mocheresis.

In 554, news spread about him being critically ill. However, he launched an attack and dislodged a superior Byzantine force from Telephis, their most forward position, causing a general retreat along the Phasis River. He did not pursue them or otherwise press his advantage because his army lacked supplies and siege equipment. After strengthening his own forts, including Onoguris, he returned to Mocheresis. By this time he was old, lame, and unable to ride, but also considered a valuable commander because he was brave, experienced, and "energetic as a youth". There he fell ill and withdrew to Iberia; he died of his illness at Mtskheta in the summer of 555. Agathias has described his exotic burial, a sky burial that was according to the Zoroastrian orthodoxy (see dakhma).

A brilliant organiser and an excellent tactician, he was above all a man of intrepid spirit. When he was already an old man and had long been crippled in both his feet so badly that he was unable even to ride a horse he displayed the stamina and endurance of a young man in his prime. Nor did he fail to take part in the actual fighting, but borne on a litter he would move about the ranks of battle, exhorting and encouraging his men and issuing timely and accurate instructions he struck terror into the hearts of the enemy and reaped the fruits of many a victory. Never indeed was there a more striking illustration of the fact that brains and not brawn are the prerequisite of a good general.

— Agathias, The Histories Book II.22.5

After his death, Nachoragan succeeded him in his command.
