= Gubazes II of Lazica =

King of Lazica

Gubazes II გუბაზ II

King of Lazica
- Reign: c. 541 – 555
- Predecessor: Tzath I of Lazica
- Successor: Tzath II of Lazica
- Mother: Valeriana
- Religion: Georgian Orthodox Church (?)

Gubazes II (Georgian: გუბაზ II, Greek: Γουβάζης) was king of Lazica (modern western Georgia) from circa 541 until his assassination in 555. He was one of the central personalities of the Lazic War (541–562). He originally ascended the throne as a vassal of the Byzantine Empire, but the heavy-handed actions of the Byzantine authorities led him to seek the assistance of Byzantium's main rival, Sassanid Persia. The Byzantines were evicted from Lazica with the aid of a Persian army in 541, but the Persian occupation of the country turned out to be worse, and by 548, Gubazes was requesting assistance from Byzantium. Gubazes remained a Byzantine ally during the next few years, as the two empires fought for control of Lazica, with the fortress of Petra as the focal point of the struggle. Gubazes eventually quarrelled with the Byzantine generals over the fruitless continuation of the war, and was assassinated by them.

== Biography ==
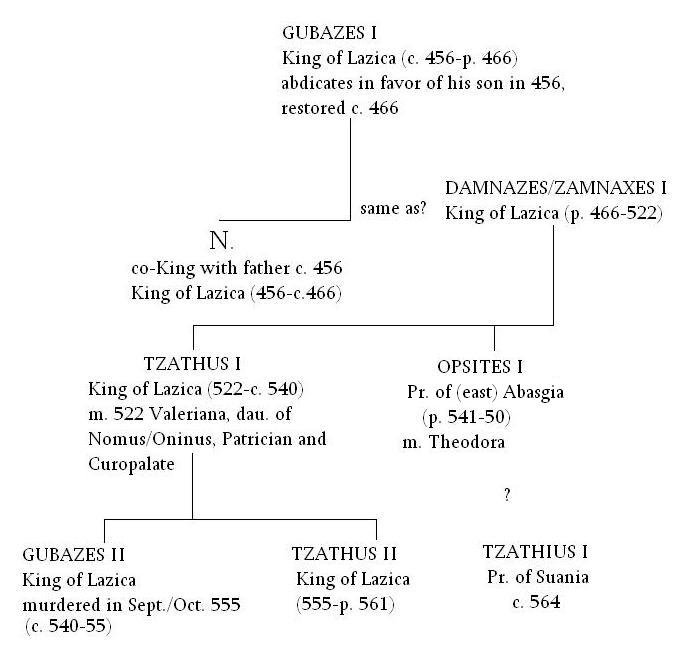
Toumanoff's tentative reconstruction of the family tree of the kings of Lazica.

=== Early life ===
Gubazes was of Byzantine descent through his mother, Valeriana. Tzathius' marriage to Valeriana seems to be the earliest recorded marriage between the Lazic and Byzantine elites. The custom of marrying Byzantine women, usually from the senatorial aristocracy, was common among the Lazic royalty: his uncle, the "king" Opsites (it is unknown when exactly he reigned), was married to a Byzantine noblewoman named Theodora. It is known that Gubazes had a younger brother, Tzath, who succeeded him on the throne, and an unnamed sister. Gubazes was married and had children, but neither the name of his wife nor of his offspring is known. The name of Gubazes's father is not known from the ancient annals. Professor Cyril Toumanoff, a specialist in Caucasian history and genealogy, has hypothesized that Gubazes was a son and direct successor of the king Tzath I, and that Opsites, his uncle, never actually ruled as a king.

The exact date of Gubazes's accession is unknown, but it must not have been much earlier than 541, when he is first attested as king of the Lazi. It is very likely that before his accession he had lived for several years at the Byzantine capital, Constantinople, for he is recorded to have been a silentiarius, an influential position at the imperial palace; alternatively, but less probably, he may have been given the title as an honorary appointment after his accession.

=== Defection to Persia ===
Lazica had been a Byzantine client state since 522, when its king, Tzath I, had rejected Persian hegemony. However, during the rule of Emperor Justinian I (reigned 527–565), a series of heavy-handed Byzantine measures made them unpopular. In particular, the establishment of a trade monopoly by the magister militum (general) John Tzibus, which was regulated from the newly constructed fortress of Petra, drove Gubazes to seek once again the protection of the Persian shah, Khosrau I (r. 531–579).

In 540, Khosrau broke the "Eternal Peace" of 532 and invaded the Byzantine province of Mesopotamia. In spring 541, Khosrau and his troops, led by Lazi guides, marched over the mountain passes into Lazica, where Gubazes submitted to him. The Byzantines under John Tzibus resisted valiantly from Petra, but Tzibus was killed, and the fortress fell soon after. Khosrau left a Persian garrison at Petra and departed the country, but soon, the Lazi grew discontented: as Christians, they resented the Persians' Zoroastrianism, and they were greatly affected by the cessation of the Black Sea trade with Byzantium. The contemporary Byzantine historian Procopius of Caesarea reports that Khosrau, who was aware of Lazica's strategic importance, intended to resettle the entire Lazi people and replace them with Persians. As a first step, the Persian ruler planned to assassinate Gubazes. Forewarned of Khosrau's intentions, Gubazes switched his allegiance back to Byzantium.

=== Return to Byzantine allegiance ===
The Kingdom of Lazica and surrounding regions in the 6th century

In 548, Emperor Justinian dispatched 8,000 men under Dagisthaeus, who together with a Lazic force set siege to the Persian garrison at Petra. As the Persians were well provisioned, the siege dragged on. Dagisthaeus had neglected to keep watch over the mountain passes that led into Lazica, and a far larger Persian relief force under Mermeroes arrived and raised the siege. Yet, the Persians lacked sufficient supplies, and so, after strengthening the garrison at Petra and leaving a further 5,000 men under Phabrizus to secure its supply routes, Mermeroes left. In the spring of the next year, Gubazes and Dagisthaeus combined their forces, destroyed Phabrizus's army in a surprise attack, and pursued the survivors into Caucasian Iberia. In the same summer, they won another victory against a new Persian army led by Khorianes at the Battle of Hippis River. The allies failed, however, to prevent another Persian army from reinforcing Petra, and Dagisthaeus was recalled and replaced by Bessas.

In 550, a pro-Persian revolt broke out among the Abasgians, a people that neighboured Lazica to the north. This provided an opportunity for a high-ranking Lazic noble named Terdetes, who had quarreled with Gubazes, to betray to the Persians Tzibile, an important fort in the land of the Apsili, a tribe under Lazic suzerainty. The Apsili retook the fort, but refused to accept Lazic rule until persuaded to do so by the Byzantine general John Guzes. In 551, the Byzantines finally took and razed Petra, but a new army under Mermeroes was able to establish Persian control over the eastern part of Lazica. The Byzantine forces in Lazica withdrew west to the mouth of the Phasis, while the Lazi, including Gubazes and his family, sought refuge in the mountains. Despite enduring harsh conditions in the winter of 551/552, Gubazes rejected the peace offers conveyed by envoys from Mermeroes. In 552, the Persians received substantial reinforcements, but their attacks on the fortresses held by the Byzantines and the Lazi were repulsed.

=== Death ===
Over the next two years, the Byzantines increased their forces in Lazica, but failed to achieve decisive success; Gubazes quarreled with their generals, and wrote to Emperor Justinian accusing them of incompetence following a defeat by the Persians. Bessas was recalled, but the other two, Martin and the sacellarius Rusticus, resolved to get rid of Gubazes. They sent a message to Constantinople accusing Gubazes of dealings with the Persians. Emperor Justinian, intending to question Gubazes himself, authorized the two generals to arrest him, using force if necessary. The two Byzantine generals then (September/October 555) invited Gubazes to observe the siege of a Persian-held fort, but when they met, John, Rusticus's brother, stabbed the king with his dagger. Gubazes fell from his horse, and one of Rusticus's servants gave him the finishing blow.

After Gubazes's murder, the Lazi stopped participating in operations against the Persians for a time, leading to the failure of a Byzantine attack against the fort of Onoguris. An assembly of the Lazic people informed Emperor Justinian of the events, requested that an investigation be launched, and asked that Gubazes's younger brother Tzath, at the time residing in Constantinople, be confirmed as their new ruler. The Byzantine emperor complied with their requests: a "leading senator" named Athanasius (perhaps the former praetorian prefect of the same name) was dispatched to investigate Gubazes's murder, and Tzath was sent to assume the Lazic throne. Athanasius's investigation cleared Gubazes of any suspicion of treachery; Rusticus and his brother John were found guilty and executed in autumn 556, but Martin was simply deposed from his post.

== Sources ==
- Braund, David (1994). Georgia in Antiquity: A History of Colchis and Transcaucasian Iberia, 550 BC–AD 562. Oxford: Clarendon Press. ISBN 0198144733.
- Bury, John Bagnell (1958) [1923]. History of the Later Roman Empire: From the Death of Theodosius I to the Death of Justinian, Volume 2. Mineola, New York: Dover Publications. OCLC 41478187.
- Greatrex, Geoffrey; Lieu, Samuel N. C. (2002). The Roman Eastern Frontier and the Persian Wars (Part II, 363–630 AD). London, United Kingdom: Routledge. ISBN 0-415-14687-9.
- Martindale, John Robert; Jones, Arnold Hugh Martin; Morris, J., eds. (1992). The Prosopography of the Later Roman Empire, Volume III: A.D. 527–641. Cambridge, United Kingdom: Cambridge University Press. ISBN 978-0-521-20160-5.
- Toumanoff, Cyril (1980). "How Many Kings Named Opsites?". In Coddington, John Insley; Thompson, Neil D.; Anderson, Robert Charles (eds.). A Tribute to John Insley Coddington on the Occasion of the Fortieth Anniversary of the American Society of Genealogists. Association for the Promotion of Scholarship in Genealogy.

Preceded by Tzath I (?)	King of Lazica ca. 541 – 555	Succeeded by Tzath II
