= John Tzibus =

Byzantine general

John Tzibus or Joannes Tzibus (Latin: Ioannes Tzibus, Greek: Ἰωάννης ὁ Τζίβος) was a general of the Byzantine emperor Justinian I. He served as the magister militum per Armeniam, replacing the unpopular Peter by 535 at the latest. He founded the port city of Petra, Lazica, through which he monopolized the trade in Lazica, acting as a middleman. This triggered the Lazic king Gubazes II to switch sides. John Tzibus was killed by an arrow in the neck in 541 AD during the siege of his fortress by the Sasanians, who were now allied with the Lazic king. This marked the beginning of the Lazic War between the Sasanians and the Byzantines.
