= Dagisthaeus =

6th century Byzantine commander

- Δαγισθαῖος
- Died: after 560
- Military career
- Allegiance: Byzantine Empire
- Service years: c. 548–560
- Rank: magister militum
- Wars: Lazic War; Gothic War

Dagisthaeus (Greek: Δαγισθαῖος, Dagisthaîos) was a 6th-century Byzantine military commander, probably of Germanic origin, in the service of the emperor Justinian I. He first appears in the records of Procopius in his failed effort to recapture the fortress of Petra in Lazica during the Lazic War in 548. Although he won several victories in Lazica afterward, his failure to capture Petra led to his detention and replacement. He was released in 551 to serve under Narses in the Gothic War in Italy, where he contributed to the defeat of the Ostrogoths (Goths) in Battle of Taginae and helped recapture Rome soon after.

== Career ==
Little is known about Dagisthaeus's early life. He may have been a descendant of the Germanic chieftain Dagistheus. In 548, Dagisthaeus, still a young officer, was magister militum per Armeniam and commanded a force of 7,000 Byzantines and 1,000 Tzani auxiliaries sent to recapture the Euxine fortress of Petra, in Lazica, from a Sassanid Persian force during the Lazic War. Dagisthaeus put Petra under siege, but, according to the contemporary historian Procopius, acted in an incompetent manner. He was so confident in victory that he wrote to Justinian, indicating what rewards he thought he and his brother deserved. Dagisthaeus failed in his task, however, and had to flee before a relieving Sassanid army towards the Phasis River, without giving orders to his men.

In 550, Dagisthaeus, joined by the Lazi under King Gubazes, was able to defeat two Persian field armies in Lazica, one under the command of Phabrizus on the Phasis and the other under Chorianes at the Battle of Hippis River. Nevertheless, the Lazi held Dagisthaeus responsible for his failure at Petra and denounced him before Justinian, who had him placed in detention and replaced with Bessas in 549.

Around 551, Dagisthaeus was released from custody and sent to fight against the Goths in Italy under the command of the chamberlain Narses. He commanded the right flank of the Byzantine army at the Battle of Taginae against the Goths under their king Totila. He played a leading role in the reconquest of Rome. Under Narses's instructions, he led a group of soldiers to a point on the walls with no defenders and scaled them, ending the Gothic garrison's resistance. Procopius remarked that while Bessas had lost Rome and recovered Petra, Dagisthaeus had failed at Petra but reconquered Rome. He presumably remained in Italy helping Narses to reestablish Byzantine control of the Italian Peninsula, being there in the early 560s.
