= Lazic War =

Byzantine–Sasanian war (541–562)

- Part of the Byzantine–Sasanian Wars
Date	541–562
Location	Colchis (Western Georgia)
Result	Disputed (see § Outcome)
Territorial changes	Status quo ante bellum

Belligerents
Byzantine Empire: Lazica (548–562); Tzani; Alans; Sabirs	Sasanian Empire: Lazica (541–548); Abasgia; Sabirs

Commanders and leaders
Justinian I; John Tzibus †; Dagisthaeus; Bessas; Martin; Belisarius; Domninus; Gubazes II of Lazica (after 548)	Khosrow I; Mihr-Mihroe; Nachoragan; Izadgushasp; Gubazes II of Lazica (541–548)

The Lazic War, also known as the Colchidian War or in Georgian historiography as the Great War of Egrisi, was fought between the Byzantine Empire and the Sasanian Empire for control of the ancient Georgian region of Lazica. The Lazic War lasted for twenty years, from 541 to 562, and ended with the Fifty-Year Peace Treaty, which obligated the Byzantine Empire to pay tribute to Persia each year for the recognition of Lazica as a Byzantine vassal state by the Persians. The Lazic War is narrated in detail in the works of Procopius and Agathias.

== Lazica ==
Lazica, situated on the eastern shore of the Black Sea, and controlling important mountain passes across the Caucasus and to the Caspian Sea, had a key strategic importance for both empires. For Byzantines, it was a barrier against a Persian advance through Iberia to the coasts of the Black Sea. Persians on the other side hoped to gain access to the sea, and control a territory from which Iberia, which was by now under their firm domination, could be threatened.

Lazica featured a difficult terrain and was surrounded by naturally impregnable borders. Besides, it was protected by strong fortresses, including Petra, Archaeopolis, Sarapanis, Skande, Phasis, Rhodopolis, Uchimerion, Kotayon, Onoguris, Trachea, Sebastopolis and Pitius.

== Background ==
The Persian Sasanians recognized Lazica (Egrisi) as part of the Roman/Byzantine sphere of influence by the "Eternal Peace" Treaty of 532. By that time, in order to foster their influence over the local monarchy, the Byzantines had insisted on the conversion of the king, Tzath I: he received both baptism and royal attributes in Constantinople from Emperor Justin I (Justinian's predecessor) in 522/3. Byzantine garrisons were stationed in Lazica and in neighboring Abasgia, mostly in the coastal cities of Poti, Sebastopolis and Pitius. The kingdom's capital, Archaeopolis, was fortified, as well as the southern access to the kingdom on the coastal road at Petra (present-day Tsikhisdziri, north of Batumi). In 536, however, the Byzantine presence turned into a full protectorate, as the king lost many powers to the new magister militum per Armeniam John Tzibus. When Tzibus curtailed the freedom of trade of Lazic tradesmen to advance Byzantine interests, the popular dissatisfaction led to a full-scale uprising in 541, and the weakened king, Gubazes II, secretly sought Persian assistance against the Byzantines.

== War ==
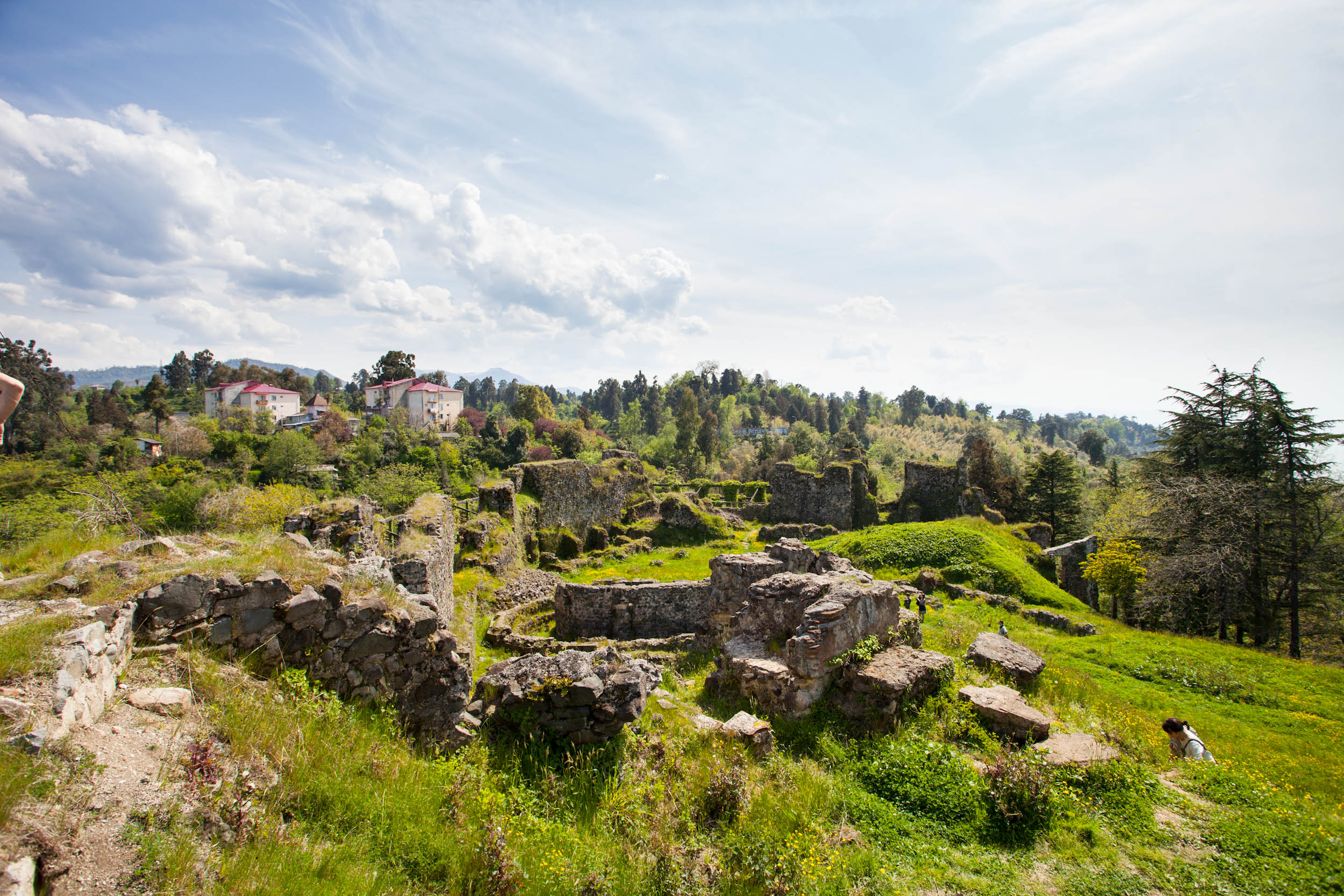
Ruins of the Petra fortress and the Church of St. John the Baptist

Those calls were answered that year by the Persian king Khosrow I, who entered Lazica, captured the Byzantine main stronghold of Petra, and established another protectorate over the country. Khosrow I retreated to Persia a year later after an abortive invasion of Commagene. In 543, a Roman invasion of Armenia was defeated by a small Persian force at Anglon, and Khosrow I unsuccessfully besieged Edessa in Mesopotamia a year later. A peace treaty was signed in 545.

The remains of the Roman fortifications of Archaeopolis

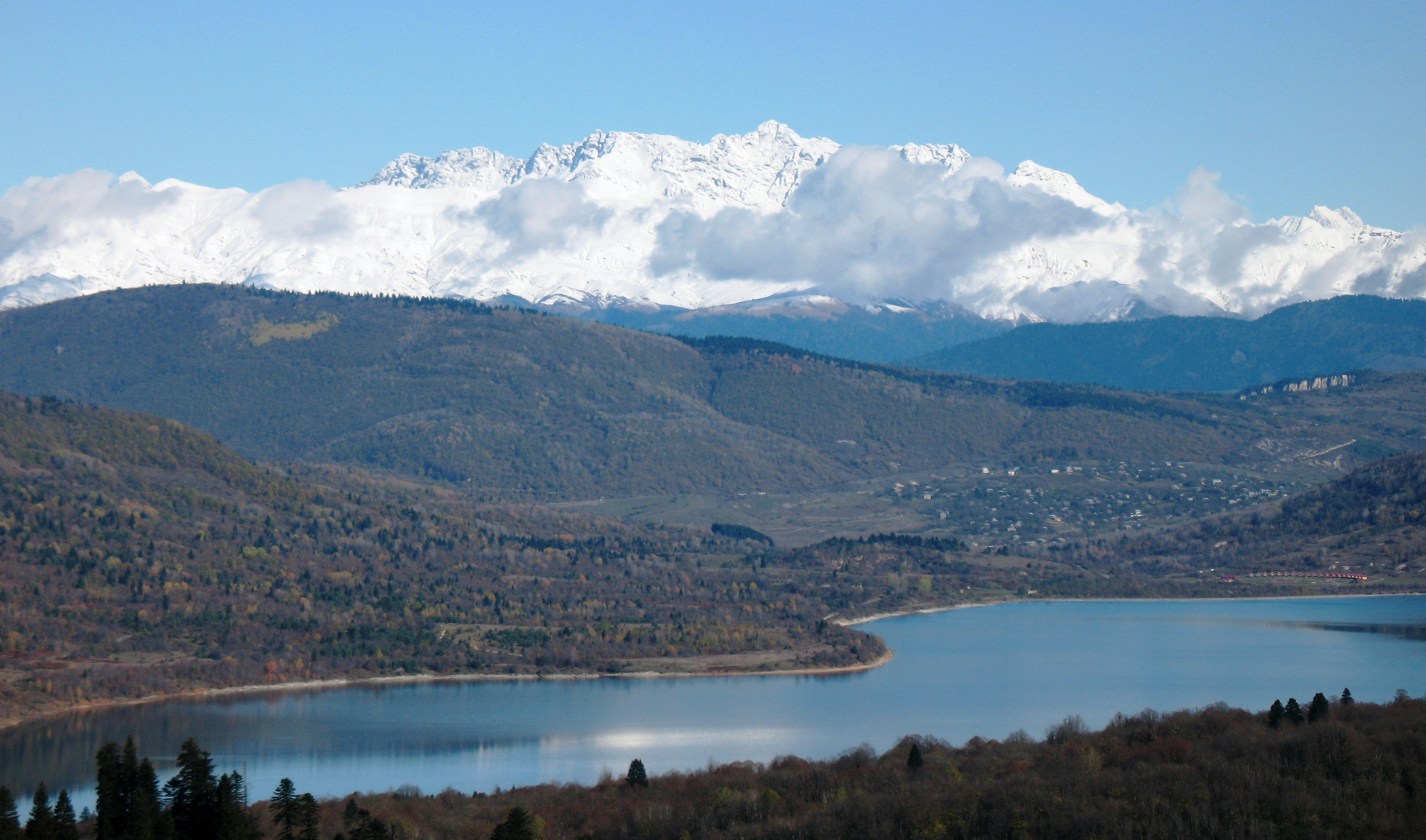
Scymnia (Lechkhumi)

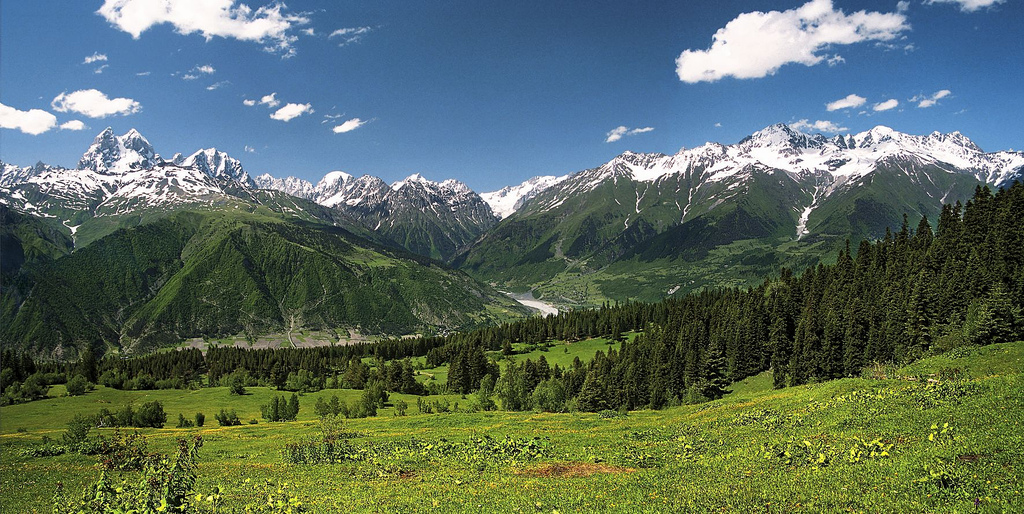
Suania (Svaneti)

In Lazica, Khosrow I's attempt to establish direct Persian control over the country and the missionary zeal of the Zoroastrian priests soon caused discontent in Christian Lazica and King Gubazes revolted in 548, this time against the Persians. Gubazes II requested aid from Emperor Justinian I and allied with the Alans and Sabirs. Justinian sent 7,000 Roman and 1,000 Tzani (relatives of the Lazes) auxiliaries under Dagisthaeus to assist Gubazes and besieged the fortress of Petra but faced tough resistance from its heavily outnumbered garrison. Persian reinforcements under Mihr-Mihroe defeated a small Byzantine force guarding the mountain passes and then relieved the besieged Petra. Lacking enough supplies, Mihr-Mihroe garrisoned 3,000 men in the fortress and marched to Armenia leaving 5,000 soldiers to supply Petra. This force was destroyed by Dagisthaeus at the Phasis river in 549. The next Persian offensive also proved to be unsuccessful with the commander Chorianes killed in a decisive battle at the river Hippis (now the Tskhenistskali). Nevertheless, the Persians manage to resupply Petra. The new Byzantine commander Bessas quelled a pro-Persian revolt of the Abasgi tribe, took and dismantled the fort of Petra after a lengthy siege and fierce fighting. This effectively foiled Khosrow I's scheme to challenge Byzantine hegemony in the Black Sea. But if the Persians could not have the Black Sea coast, they could still seize the lion's share of Lazica. This change of focus set the tone for the next five years of war. Mihr-Mihroe's attempt to capture the main Byzantine stronghold of Archaeopolis failed in 551 as many of his men were lost due to a lack of supplies. However, he was unopposed elsewhere and captured Cotais and the fortress of Uthimereos, blocking the important roads to the highland regions of Scymnia and Souania, which were also captured by him later. In the summer of 555, he dislodged a superior Byzantine-Lazic force at Telephis and Ollaria by stratagem and forced them to retreat to Nesos. Mihr-Mihroe died of illness shortly after and was replaced by Nachoragan.

King Gubazes quarreled with Byzantine commanders Bessas, Martin, and Rusticus, complaining to emperor Justinian. Bessas was recalled, but Rusticus and his brother John eventually murdered Gubazes. To redress this with a victory on the battlefield, the Byzantine generals launched a full-scale assault at Onoguris, which was repulsed by a small force under Nachoragan, who momentarily took and destroyed the main Byzantine base at Archaeopolis, which Mihr-Mihroe had twice tried and failed to take. These defeats and the murder of the Lazic king caused a bitter feud between the Lazic and Byzantine generals. The Lazi people got the Emperor to nominate Tzathes, the younger brother of Gubazes, as their new king, and Senator Athanasius investigated the assassination. Rusticus and John were arrested, tried, and executed. In 556, the allies retook Archaeopolis and routed Nachoragan in his abortive attack on Phasis. In the autumn and winter of the same year, the Byzantines suppressed a rebellion staged by the mountain tribe of the Misimians, and finally made peace.

== Outcome ==
In 557, a truce ended the hostilities between the Byzantines and Persians. By the "Fifty Years Peace" of Dara of 562, the Byzantine Empire was obliged to pay tribute to Persia each year in return for the recognition of Lazica as a Roman vassal state. The expenses of the defense lines in the Caucasus, for which there was a mutual interest and had been the responsibility of the Sasanians, were included in the payments. Although no clear winner emerged from the conflict, the Sasanian Empire thus held a slight advantage since Rome was required to pay a set amount to Persia annually. The Persian Empire encyclopedia claims that the Sasanian Empire won this war, but some historians say that the result of the war was indecisive. On the other hand, Dr. Richard Fyre claimed that Khosrow I lost the war.

== See also ==
- Iberian War

== Sources ==
- Alemany, Agustí (2003). "Sixth Century Alania: Between Byzantium, Sasanian Iran and the Turkic World" (PDF). Transoxiana: Journal Libre de Estudios Orientales (Transoxiana Webfestschrift Series): 1–8.
- Salia, Kalistrat (1980). Histoire de la nation géorgienne. Nino Salia.
- Bury, John Bagnell (1958) [1923]. History of the Later Roman Empire: From the Death of Theodosius I to the Death of Justinian, Volume 2. Mineola, New York: Dover Publications. OCLC 41478187.
- Hughes, Ian (2009). Belisarius: The Last Roman General. South Yorkshire: Pen & Sword Military. ISBN 9781844158331.
- Martindale, John Robert; Jones, Arnold Hugh Martin; Morris, J., eds. (1992). The Prosopography of the Later Roman Empire, Volume III: A.D. 527–641. Cambridge, United Kingdom: Cambridge University Press. ISBN 978-0-521-20160-5.
- Greatrex, Geoffrey (1991). The Roman Eastern Frontier and the Persian wars. Part II. 363-630 AD. Routledge. ISBN 0-415-14687-9.
