= Petra, Lazica =

Ancient city in Lazica (modern Georgia)

Petra
- Petra Pia Justiniana
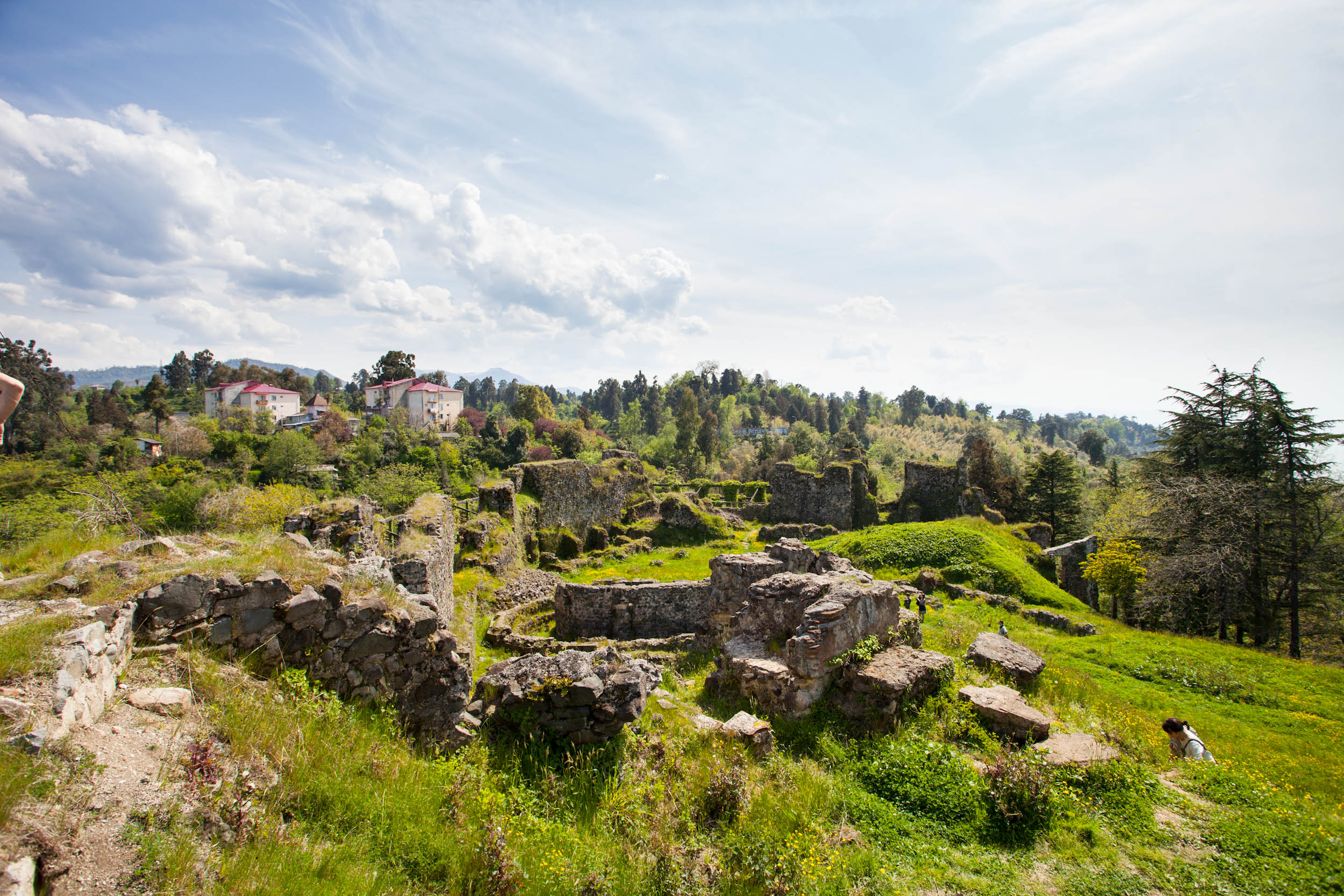
- Ruins of a fortress at Tsikhisdziri identified as Petra

- Location within Georgia
- 41°46′06″N 41°45′12″E
- Type: Fortified settlement
- Periods: Late Antiquity
- Location: Lazica (Kobuleti Municipality, Adjara, Georgia
- Region: South Caucasus
- Part of: Eastern Roman Empire

History
- Event: Lazic War

Petra (Greek: Πέτρα) was a fortified town on the eastern Black Sea coast, in Lazica in what is now western Georgia. In the 6th century, under the Byzantine emperor Justinian I, it served as an important Eastern Roman outpost in the Caucasus and, due to its strategic location, became a battleground of the 541–562 Lazic War between Rome and Sasanian Persia (Iran). Mainstream scholarly opinion identifies Petra with a ruined settlement of Late Antiquity at the village of Tsikhisdziri in Adjara, southwestern Georgia.

== History ==
=== Foundation ===
Petra is first referred to in the Novellae Constitutiones by the Eastern Roman emperor Justinian I, dated to 535. It was built to reinforce the Roman authority in the kingdom of Lazica, located on the southeastern shores of the Black Sea and, with the emperor's approval, was named in his honor as Petra Pia Justiniana. According to the contemporary historian Procopius, Petra was founded through the efforts of the Roman official John Tzibus, who thereafter exercised tight control of imports into Lazica and controlled local access to luxury commodities and much-needed salt. The name of Petra, literally, "rock" in Greek, was a reference to the rocky and precipitous coast where the city was built. Its location between the sea and the cliffs rendered the city inaccessible, except for a narrow and rocky stretch of level ground, which was defended by a defensive wall with two towers.

=== Lazic War ===
Tzibus' monopolization of trade in Petra soured Rome's relations with the Lazi, whose king, Gubazes, secretly sought Sasanian assistance against Rome. This occasioned an invasion by a Sasanian army under Khosrow I in 541 and twenty years of war in Lazica, in the course of which Petra changed hands several times. In 541, Khosrow, following an initial unsuccessful assault on the fortifications of the city, captured Petra by sending his troops through a secretly constructed tunnel and destroying the towers, which induced the Romans to capitulate. Khosrow appropriated the riches of Tzibus, who was killed in battle, but treated the Romans of the city with consideration.

In 548, Justinian sent a force under Dagisthaeus—this time allied with the Lazi, who had become discontent with Sasanian hegemony—to retake Petra. The allies besieged the city and defeated two Sasanian field armies sent to its aid, but subsequent maneuvers by the Iranian commander Mermeroes made the besiegers' positions untenable. Eventually, Dagisthaeus failed to retake Petra in 549 and withdrew the same year. In 551, a Roman–Lazi army under Bessas began a second siege. After more than a year, the city fell and Bessas razed the city fortress to the ground to prevent it again becoming a Sasanian target. However, recent archaeological evidence from Tsikhisdziri suggests that the site survived well into the 7th century AD and beyond, with the fortification walls remaining in use and repeatedly repaired.

== Archaeology ==
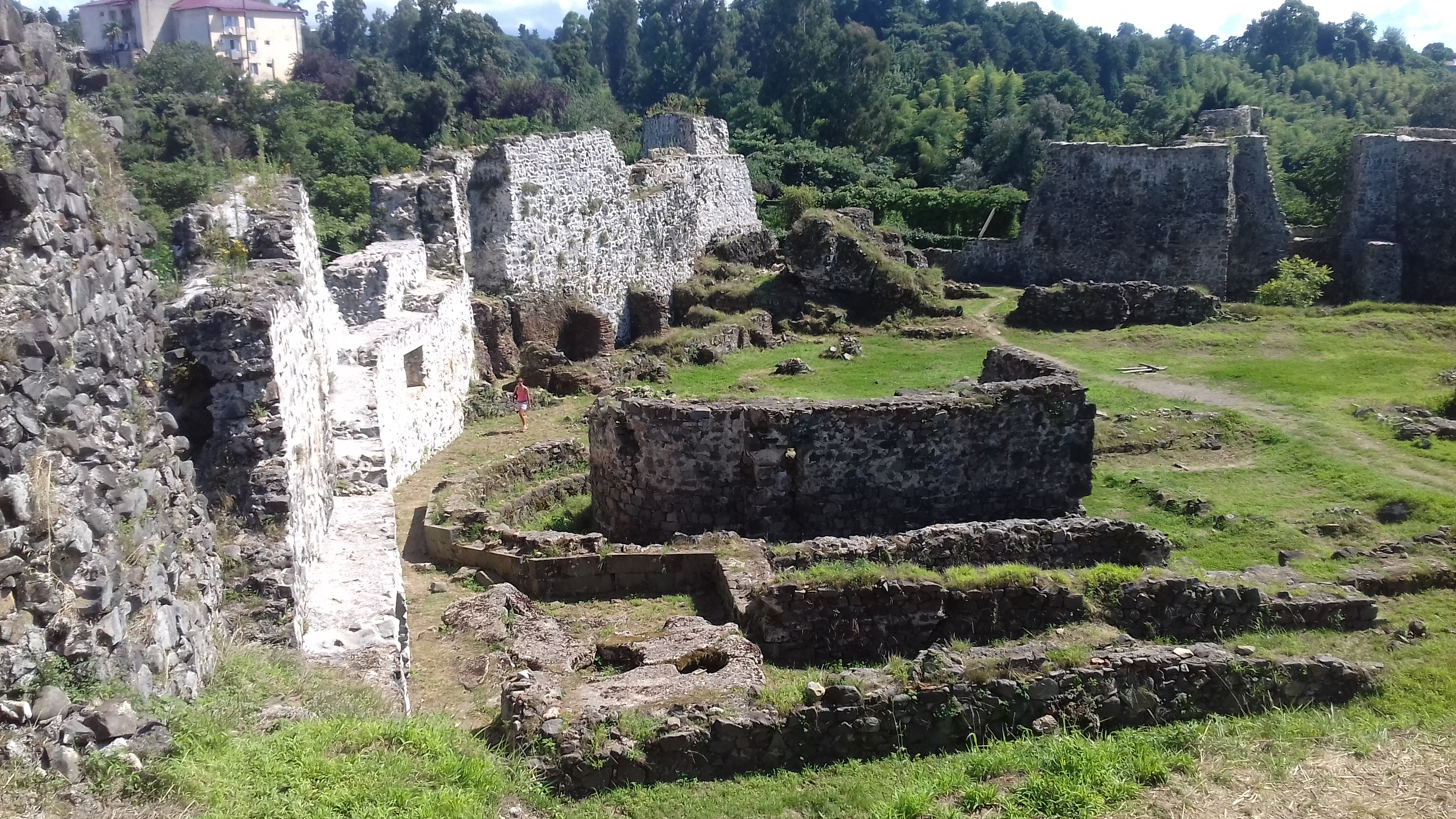
The ruins of a 6th-century basilica at Tsikhisdziri.

Mainstream scholarly opinion identifies Petra with a ruined settlement found in the village of Tsikhisdziri, in Georgia's southwestern autonomous republic of Adjara, between Batumi and Kobuleti. It contains ruins of a citadel—200 m in length and 100 m in width—located on two neighboring rocky seaside hills and a large 6th-century three-nave basilica with a narthex, projecting apse, and mosaic floor, which was probably a bishop's seat. Other buildings from that time are a bath, water cistern, several other structures—remains of an urban settlement—as well as more than 300 burials located nearby. The site has also yielded several Late Bronze Age, Hellenistic, Roman, and medieval objects. Literary and archaeological evidence suggest Petra was a result of a Justinianian expansion of an earlier small Roman fort. The site is inscribed on the Cultural Heritage of Georgia list and protected as the Tsikhisdziri–Petra Archaeological and Architectural Museum Reserve.

The first to have suggested Tsikhisdziri as a location of the Roman-era city of Petra was the Greek Patriarch of Jerusalem, Dositheos II, who toured western Georgia in the 1670s. This view was shared by the leading 19th-century students of the history of Georgia, such as Marie-Félicité Brosset and Dimitri Bakradze, and based on a more solid scholarly footing by Simon Janashia in 1949. There are some modern scholars who have rejected the identification of Petra with the Tsikhisdziri site, such as Simon Kaukhchishvili, a translator and critical editor of the Byzantine sources on Georgia, and Guram Grigolia.

== Bishopric ==
The diocese, plausibly a suffragan of Phasis as listed in the Annuario Pontifio, didn't survive, but was nominally restored in 1933 as a Latin Catholic Titular bishopric under the names of Petra in Lazica (Latin), Petra di Lazica (Curiate Italian), Petren(sis) in Lazica (Latin adjective), of the Episcopal (lowest) rank, but remains vacant as per February 2017, without having had a single incumbent.
