= Lazica =

Former country

Kingdom of Lazica ეგრისის სამეფო
- 131 AD–697
- Kingdom of Lazica in the 4th–5th c. AD
- Status: Kingdom
- Capital: Archaeopolis
- Common languages: Zan; Old Georgian; Greek (religious)
- Religion: Georgian paganism; Eastern Orthodoxy (pre-Schism)
- King
  - 131–?: Malassas (first)
  - 556–?: Tzath II (last)
- Historical era: Classical antiquity
  - Established: 131 AD
  - vassal of Roman Empire: 2nd to 5th century
  - Lazic War: 541 to 562 AD
  - annexation of Lazica by Byzantine Empire: 7th
  - Disestablished: 697
- Currency: Antoninianus until IV A.D, later Solidus
Preceded by	Succeeded by
Roman Empire; Colchis	Kingdom of Abkhazia
- Today part of: Countries today: Georgia; Russia; Turkey

The Kingdom of Lazica (Georgian: ეგრისი, romanized: Egrisi; Laz: ლაზიკა, romanized: Laziǩa; Ancient Greek: Λαζική, romanized: Lazikḗ), sometimes called Lazian Empire, was a state in the territory of west Georgia in the Roman period, from about the 1st century BC. Created as a result of the collapse of the kingdom of Colchis and the gaining of independence by the tribal-territorial units included in it in 131 AD.

== Name ==
In the Svan language, the Svans refer to the Mingrelia (Samegrelo) region as Lazan, La- is the Svan territorial prefix and Lazan means "the land of the Zans".

== History ==
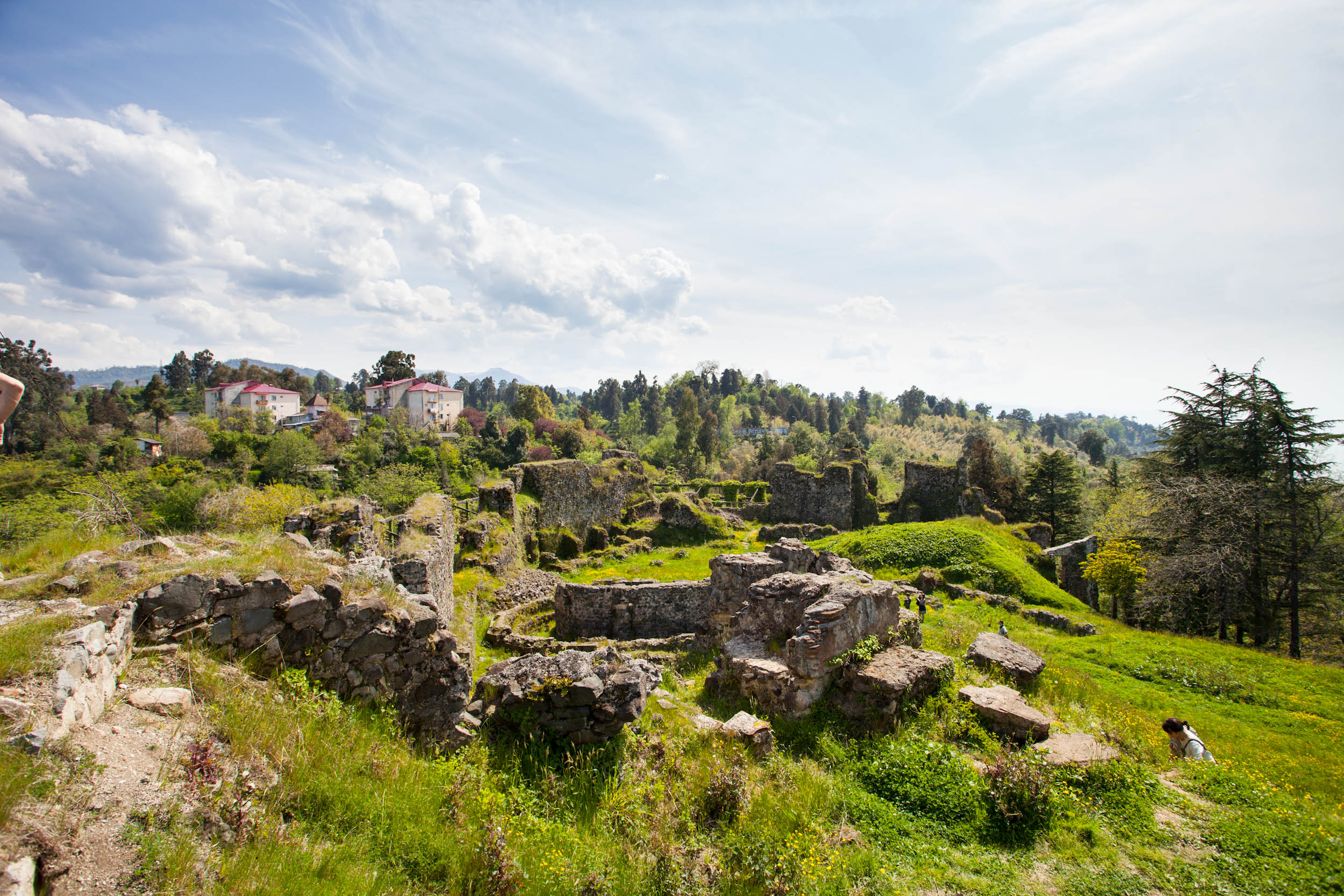
Ruins of the Petra fortress

From the 1st century AD onward, the Mingrelian-Laz people, who came to be referred to as "Laz" or "Manraloi (Mingrelian)" rather than Colchians, launched a struggle for independence, first against the rule of Polemon and later against the Roman Empire. Between 69 and 79, a Laz admiral named Anicetus led his people in revolt against the Romans. Unwilling to relinquish control of Lazica, a strategically important region, the Romans were eventually forced to withdraw in the face of the Laz struggle for independence. Lucian of Samosata, in his work Toxaris, written in AD 163, mentions a Laz prince named "Tigrapat". Although this may suggest that a semi-independent Laz state existed at the time, there is no evidence confirming the historical existence of this prince.

The growing power of Lazica, the expansion of Laz raids across the Çoruh River into the southeastern Black Sea region, and the mass migration of Laz people into the area alarmed Polemon II, a Roman vassal. In an attempt to protect his kingdom from the Laz, he surrendered his government to the Romans. The territory subsequently became a province of the Roman Empire, known as Pontus Polemoniacus. Although the region extending from east of Trabzon to the valley of the Çoruh had long been densely inhabited by the Laz, it remained outside the Kingdom of Lazica's direct rule.

From the 2nd century onward, the Kingdom of Lazica grew increasingly powerful. Although it did not extend its direct administrative control as far as Trabzon in the 4th century, it brought the city within its sphere of influence. The division of the Roman Empire in 395 enabled Lazica to strengthen and expand, bringing Phasis, corresponding to present-day western Georgia, together economically, politically, and militarily. Although the Kingdom of Lazica was a Byzantine vassal, it also had vassals of its own.

Lazica was not an ordinary vassal state, as it enjoyed considerable privileges. Procopius states that the kings of Lazica did not obey the orders of the Roman emperor, pay tribute, or provide military support when the emperor embarked on military campaigns. They also enjoyed considerable autonomy in domestic affairs. When a Laz king died, the Laz themselves chose his successor; the emperor merely sent the new king the insignia of royal authority, while the "Romans" did not interfere with the Laz decision. Because of Lazica's strategically important position as a bulwark against nomadic peoples, particularly the Huns, and because other great powers, particularly the Persians, were aware of the region's importance, the Roman Empire maintained friendly relations with Lazica, whose kingdom was responsible for defending the frontier in the region. As a result, Lazica received financial and military assistance from the empire. This support was intended to enable the Laz to protect the passes against nomadic incursions. The Persians were aware of this assistance and sought either to establish control over Lazica or, at the very least, to avoid war with it.

In the mid-5th century, King Gubazes I sought to end his kingdom's dependence on the Byzantine Empire completely and to place his son on the throne as co-ruler. In response, the Byzantine emperor Marcian launched a campaign against Lazica, but was defeated. Following this failure, the Byzantines began preparing for another campaign. Although Gubaz attempted to form an alliance with the Iranian Shah Yazdegerd II, the Sasanian Empire was preoccupied with its war against the Huns and rejected the alliance. Eventually, at the insistence of the Byzantine emperor, Gubaz was forced to abdicate and transfer the throne to his son. The Svans and Sanigs took advantage of the conflict with Byzantium and declared their independence in the 470s. In the early 6th century, the Kingdom of Lazica temporarily came under Sasanian influence. In 523, the Laz king Tzath I was installed on the throne by the Byzantine emperor. During the 6th century, the Kingdom of Lazica became a battleground in the Roman–Persian Wars. Detailed information about this period is provided in The Wars, the work of the 6th-century Byzantine historian Procopius.

After establishing a strong position in the eastern Caucasus, including Iberia, Caucasian Albania, and part of Armenia, the Persians attached particular strategic importance to the Kingdom of Lazica. In 528, Persian forces occupied the fortified towns of Shorapani and Skanda in Lazica. Byzantine auxiliary forces came to the aid of the Laz king, and the Persians were defeated. In 532, the Eternal Peace treaty was concluded, restoring the pre-war situation. Emperor Justinian I subsequently strengthened Byzantine authority in Lazica by constructing the fortress of Petra, establishing a trade monopoly, and stationing troops in the fortified towns of Lazica. These measures contributed to the deterioration of relations between the Byzantines and the Laz and eventually led to the revolt of King Gubazes II.

Dissatisfied with Byzantine hegemony, the Laz sought assistance from the Persian shah. In 541, Khosrow I entered Lazica at the head of a large army. The Persians were guided through the country by men sent by Gubazes II, and the combined Persian-Laz forces captured Petra, the principal Byzantine stronghold in the region. Khosrow subsequently returned to Persia after learning that a Byzantine army under Belisarius had invaded Persian territory, leaving a Persian garrison at Petra. A five-year truce between the Byzantine and Persian empires was concluded in 545, although it did not bring an end to the conflict in Lazica.

Persian rule soon caused dissatisfaction among the Laz. According to the historical reconstruction of the period, the Persians sought to consolidate their control over Lazica and considered replacing the local population with Persians. A plan was also developed to assassinate King Gubazes. The Laz nobleman Pharsanses, who had been considered for the task, instead informed Gubazes of the Persian plans. Gubazes consequently abandoned his alliance with Persia and appealed to Emperor Justinian for Byzantine assistance. By this time, Justinian had largely resolved his problems in the West.

The remnants of the eastern gate in Archaeopolis

In 549, a Byzantine army under the command of Dagisthaeus reached Petra. Khosrow sent a large army under Mermeroes to relieve the Persian garrison there. Dagisthaeus made a strategic error by sending only a small detachment to defend the Likhi Pass on the frontier of Lazica. The Persian army consequently succeeded in entering Lazica without encountering significant resistance. The Byzantines abandoned the siege of Petra and withdrew, while the Persians strengthened the fortress and began advancing into the interior of Lazica. The Laz, led by Gubazes, mounted strong resistance against the Persians, eventually forcing them to withdraw from Lazica and return to Iberia. In 550, Khosrow sent another army to Lazica under the command of Chorianes. During the ensuing battle, Chorianes was mortally wounded, causing confusion among the Persian forces. Unable to withstand the attacks of the Laz, the Persian army was defeated. The Byzantines subsequently captured Petra, but instead of retaining control of the fortress, they destroyed it.

Lazica

Khosrow subsequently sent another army to Lazica under Mermeroes. This time, the Persian objective was to capture Archaeopolis, but the attempt failed at the Battle of Archaeopolis. A Laz nobleman named Theopobit, who supported the Persians, surrendered Ukimerioni Fortress to them, opening the way toward Takveri and Svaneti. The Persians subsequently occupied Svaneti and stationed troops there. Meanwhile, the Abazg and Misimian revolts broke out against Byzantine rule, in 550 and 555 respectively. In 555, King Gubazes II was assassinated by Byzantine commanders after they accused him of obstructing their military operations and reported against him to Emperor Justinian.

The assassination of Gubazes provoked widespread anger among the Laz. During the subsequent deliberations of the Laz nobles, two factions emerged. One faction, led by Aieti, favored an alliance with Persia, while the other, led by Phartazes, advocated continuing to support Byzantium. Ultimately, the pro-Byzantine position prevailed on the condition that those responsible for Gubazes' murder be punished. Justinian accepted this condition and brought the perpetrators to justice. Gubazes' brother, Tzath II, became the new king of Lazica.

The war in Lazica ended with the peace treaty of 562. Persia renounced its claims to Lazica, which remained within the Byzantine sphere as a dependent kingdom. Svaneti, however, remained under Persian influence for some time thereafter. In the 620s, the Laz, together with the Abasgians, participated in Emperor Heraclius' campaigns against the Persians.

By the end of the 7th century, the Kingdom of Lazica had been incorporated into the Byzantine Empire as a province, and its rulers were no longer referred to as "Kings of Lazica" but instead bore the title of Patrician.

== Ecclesiastical history ==
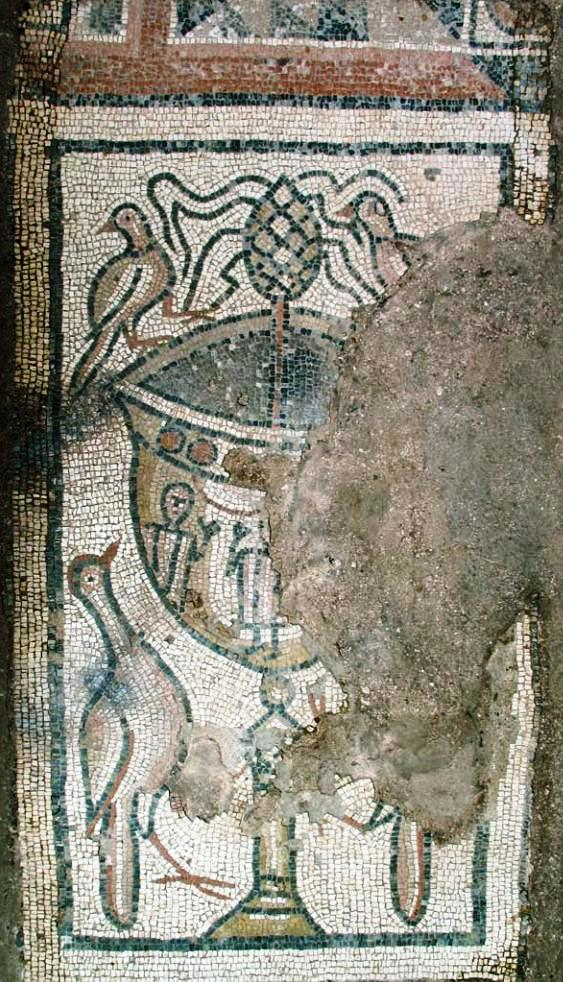
Fragment of the floor mosaic from the church at Pytius (5th century)

In the early 4th century, the Christian eparchy (eastern bishopric) of Pityus was established in this kingdom, and, as in neighboring Iberia, Christianity was declared the official religion in AD 319. Other ancient episcopal sees in Lazica included Rhodopolis, Saesina, and Zygana. Bishop Stratophilus of Pityus was among the participants of the First Council of Nicaea in 325. The first Christian king of Lazica was Tzath I; in the 5th century, Christianity became the official religion of Lazica. Later, the nobility and clergy of Lazica shifted from the Hellenic ecclesiastical tradition to the Georgian tradition, and Georgian became the language of culture and education.

== Cities and forts ==
The information about the cities of Lazica were preserved in the works of Byzantine historians. The list of cities mentioned in Byzantine sources were:

- Petra (modern Tsikhisdziri)
- Archeopolis (Nokalakevi)
- Nesos (Isula)
- Telefis (Tolebi)
- Rhodopolis (Vartsikhe)
- Skanda
- Sarapanis (Shorpani)
- Phasis (Poti)
- Pitius
- Kotayon (Kutaisi)
- Onoguris

The most significant fertile and rich area of Lazica was the Rioni river valley. A densely populated part of the territory of Colchis, where most of the Laz cities were located. In the IV-V centuries AD large cities appeared in Lazica such as: Archeopolis, Rhodopolis and Kotayon, and the population of the coastal areas increased, mainly in the areas of Phasis.

The architecture of the fortresses of Lazica, located at the key points of the main trade and military routes from the shores of the Black Sea to Iran, show the influence of Byzantine architecture.

== Economy ==
Maritime trade played a significant role in the country's economy, with the port of Phasis serving as its main center. Trade was conducted mainly with Pontus and the Bosporan Kingdom in Crimea, which were under Roman control at the time. Leather, fur, and other raw materials, as well as slaves, were exported from Lazica in large quantities. In return, the Laz imported salt, bread, wine, luxury textiles, and weapons. The destruction of free trade and the introduction of a Roman trade monopoly in Lazica are considered among the causes of the Lazic War.

The primary currency used in Lazica for trade was the Roman Antoninianus until the 4th century. Afterwards it was replaced by the Byzantine Solidus.

== Rulers ==
Ruler	Reign	Notes
1. Malassas	Mentioned by Arrian in 131	Vassal of the Roman Emperor Hadrian.
2. Pacorus	A contemporary of Antoninus Pius (r. 138–161)	Mentioned in the Historia Augusta.
3. Gubazes I	Attested c. 456–466	Initially an opponent of the Byzantines, he later reconciled with them and became their ally.
4. Damnazes	?–521/522	Vassal of the Sassanids.
5. Tzath I	Attested 521/522–527/528	He was the first Christian king of Lazica.
6. Opsites	Dates of reign unknown; likely sometime before 541	It is disputed whether he was a king.
7. Gubazes II	c. 541–555	Son of Tzath I. Assassinated by Byzantine generals.
8. Tzath II	556–?	The last king of Lazica.
9. Lebarnicius	c. 662	Mentioned as "patricius of Lazica" in the Hypomnesticon of Theodoros Spoudaios and Theodosius of Gangra.
10. Grigor	670–c. 675	His name appears on a coin issued by him, on which he is referred to as the patricius of Lazica.
11. Sergius	c. 696/697	The last patrician of Lazica. He revolted against Byzantine hegemony and acknowledged Arab suzerainty.

== See also ==
- Roman Georgia
- Laz people
- Lazistan Sanjak
- Lazistan

== Sources ==
- Lortkipanidze, Mariam; Japaridze, Otar; Muskhelishvili, David; Metreveli, Roin (2012). History of Georgia in four volumes, vol. II - History of Georgia from the 4th century to the 13th century. Tbilisi: National Academy of Sciences of Georgia. ISBN 978-9941-19-585-3.
- David Braund (1994). Georgia in Antiquity: A History of Colchis and Transcaucasian Iberia, 550 BC–AD 562. Oxford: Clarendon Press. ISBN 0-19-814473-3.
- Alexander Mikaberidze (2007). "LAZICA". Historical Dictionary of Georgia. Lanham, Md.: Scarecrow Press. pp. 422–423. ISBN 978-0-8108-5580-9.
- Garsoïan, Nina G. (1991). "Lazika". In Alexander Kazhdan (ed.). The Oxford Dictionary of Byzantium. Vol. 2. Oxford University Press. p. 1119.
- Manana Odisheli (2018). "Lazica (Egrisi)". In Oliver Nicholson (ed.). The Oxford Dictionary of Late Antiquity. Oxford University Press. p. 890. ISBN 978-0-19-866277-8.
- W. E. D. Allen (1971). A History of the Georgian People. New York: Barnes & Noble. ISBN 0-389-04030-4.
- Nikolai Berdzenishvili (1962). History of Georgia. Tbilisi: Tsodna.
- M. Lordkipanidze, D. Muskhelishvili (1988). Essays on the History of Georgia: In Eight Volumes, Vol. II. Tbilisi: Metsniereba.
- Donald Rayfield (2017). Georgia: A Crossroads of Empires. Moscow: Azbuka-Attikus. ISBN 978-5-389-12135-5.
