= Justinian's wars =

Military campaigns of emperor Justinian I

Wars of Justinian I
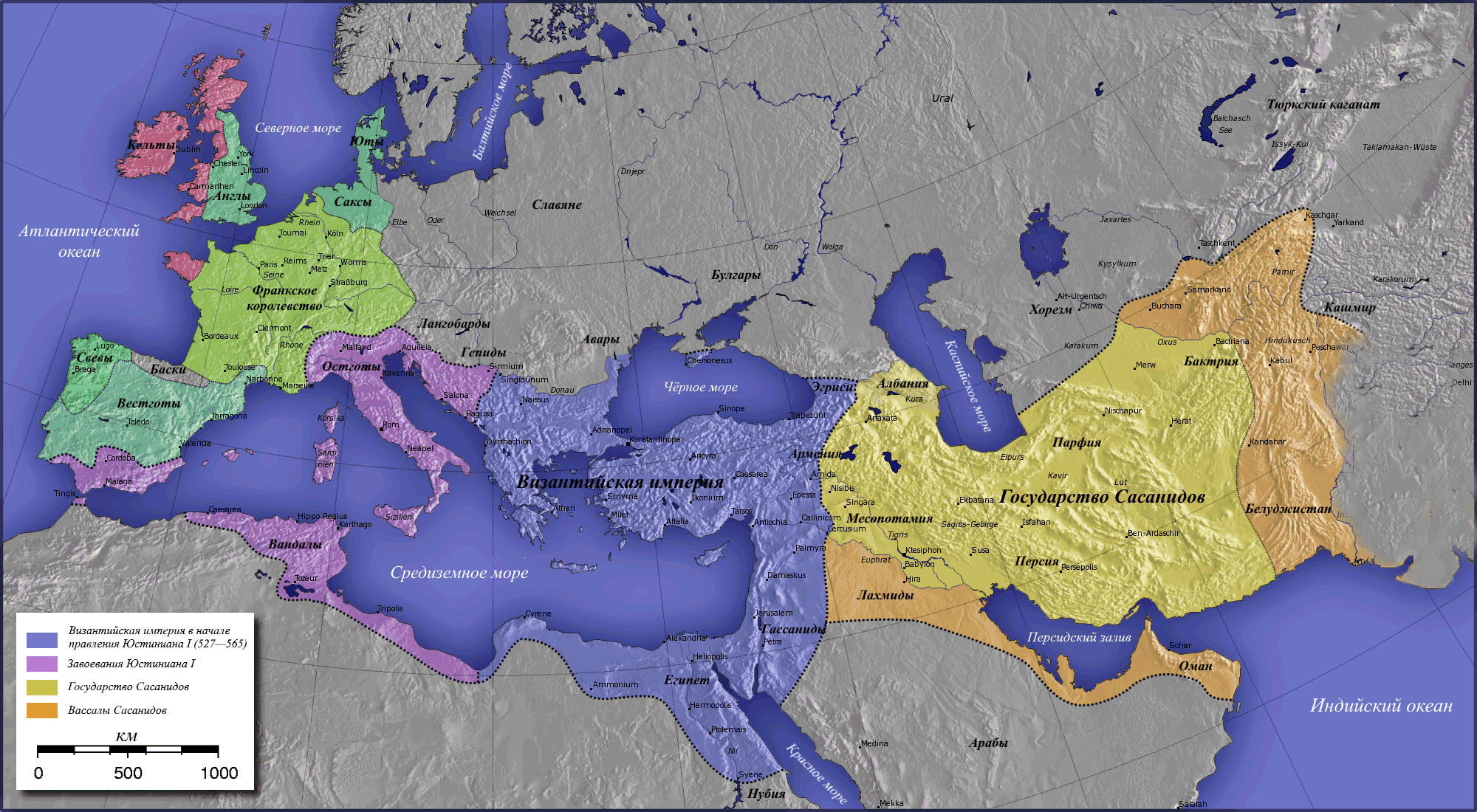
- Territorial expansion of the Eastern Roman Empire (Byzantium) from the beginning of Justinian's reign (shown in blue is the empire at the start of Justinian's reign in 527) to his death (shown in purple are the territories conquered by Justinian's generals by 565)
Date	527–562
Location	Transcaucasia, Middle East, North Africa, the Italian Peninsula, the Iberian Peninsula, the Balkans, Crimea
Result	Victory in the West: • Recovery of Italy and North Africa • Conquest of southern Spain; Status quo in the East: • Perpetual Peace (532) • Fifty-Year Peace; Repulsion of Slavic and Bulgar raids in the north.

Belligerents
Eastern Roman Empire • Ghassanids • Kingdom of Lazica (from 548); Thuringii; Lombards	Sasanian Empire • Lakhmids • Kingdom of Lazica (541–548); Vandal Kingdom; Ostrogothic Kingdom; Visigothic Kingdom; Frankish Kingdom • Alemannia; Gepid Kingdom; Bulgars; Oghurs; Kutrigurs; Sclaveni; Antes

Commanders and leaders
Justinian I Belisarius; Narses; Sittas; Hermogenes; Calonymus of Alexandria; Mundus; Bouzes; Justin (consul, 540); Germanus; Liberius; Chilbudius; Al-Harith ibn Jabalah; Athanagild; Amalafrid; Audoin; Gubazes II (from 548)	Kavad I Khosrow I Nachoragan; Gubazes II (541–548); Al-Mundhir III; Gelimer; Theodahad; Vitiges; Ildibad; Totila; Teia; Chlothar I Agila I Torisvint; Thorismund; Zabergan

Strength
Army: 150,000 legionaries (559); Navy: 92 dromons, 500 transport vessels, 30,000 oarsmen (533); 200 ships (546)	

Justinian I's reign (527–565) was marked by numerous wars that recovered extensive territories in the western Mediterranean lost by the Roman Empire in the 5th century. As a Christian emperor, Justinian considered it his duty to restore the state's former borders. In the east he continued the war with Persia begun under Justin I, with intermittent conflict lasting until 562. In the west, his campaigns against the barbarian kingdoms succeeded in conquering the Vandal Kingdom in North Africa (533–534) and in bringing Italy under Byzantine control after the war with the Ostrogoths (535–554), while less successful wars with the Visigothic Kingdom expanded Byzantine possessions in Spain. Thanks to the works of Procopius and other Byzantine historians, these wars are well studied. The Byzantine army resembled the earlier Roman army, comprising the field army (comitatenses), which numbered 150,000, and frontier troops (limitanei), with barbarians playing a significant, though debated, role.

Although Justinian's conquests destroyed several barbarian kingdoms, including the Vandals, Ostrogoths and Visigoths, the empire proved unable to defend itself against new and more dangerous peoples such as the Slavs, Avars and Lombards. Even Constantinople was threatened by attacks from the north in the final years of his reign, and under his successors Justin II, Tiberius II and Maurice the empire increasingly struggled with a shortage of manpower. Researchers attribute this to declining discipline in the "barbarised" army, demographic losses from devastating epidemics and fewer available barbarian mercenaries. By straining resources without accounting for the changed realities of the sixth century, Justinian's campaigns are widely held to have contributed to the subsequent decline of Byzantium, alongside the Plague of Justinian, the final Roman-Persian war, and most significantly, the Arab invasions of the 7th century.

== Main directions of foreign policy ==
In the beginning of Justinian's reign, the empire's neighbors in the west were the so-called "barbarian kingdoms" of the Germans, (Note: The term "Germans" was introduced in the 19th century and reflected the fact that these peoples originally spoke a Proto-Germanic language and had once lived in or near ancient Germania.) which had formed in the 5th century on the territory of the Western Roman Empire. In all of these kingdoms the conquerors made up an insignificant minority, and the descendants of the empire's inhabitants, who had inherited Roman culture, could attain high social standing. At the beginning of the 6th century these states flourished under their outstanding rulers — the Franks in northern Gaul under Clovis I, the Burgundians in the Loire valley under Gundobad, the Ostrogoths in Italy under Theodoric the Great, the Visigoths in southern Gaul and Spain under Alaric II, and the Vandals in Africa under Thrasamund. By 527, when Justinian came to the throne, these kingdoms found themselves in a difficult situation. In 508, the Visigoths had been expelled from most of Gaul by the Franks, whose kingdom was later divided among the sons of Clovis. In the first half of the 530s the Burgundians suffered defeat at the hands of the Franks. With the death of Theodoric in 526, a crisis began in the Ostrogothic Kingdom, although even during that ruler's lifetime the conflict between the parties favoring and opposing rapprochement with the Byzantine Empire had already sharpened. A similar situation developed in the early 530s in the Vandal Kingdom.

In the east, Byzantium's only opponent was the Sasanian Empire, with which the empire, with brief interruptions, had waged war since the beginning of the 3rd century. By the beginning of the 6th century, this was a prosperous and developed state, roughly equal in area to Byzantium, stretching from the Indus in the east to Mesopotamia in the west. The main challenges facing the Sasanian state at the beginning of Justinian's reign were the ongoing threat of invasions by the Hephthalite Huns, who had first appeared at the borders in the second half of the 5th century, as well as internal instability and struggles for the shahanshah's throne. Around this time a popular Mazdakism movement arose, directed against the aristocracy and the Zoroastrian priesthood (magi). At the beginning of his reign, Khosrow I (531–579) supported this movement, but by the end of his reign it had come to represent a threat to the state. Under Justin I no significant military events connected with Persia took place. Among the diplomatic events of note is the initiative of Shah Kavad, who in the mid-520-s proposed that Justin adopt his son Khosrow and make him heir to the Roman Empire. This proposal was rejected.

In foreign policy, Justinian's name is associated with the idea of "restoring the Roman Empire," or the "reconquest of the West." The first step in this direction was the conquest of Africa and the subjugation in 533 of the Vandal Kingdom, which had arisen in the territories of Roman North Africa conquered at the beginning of the 5th century. In setting out the goals of this enterprise in his Code of Justinian, the emperor deemed it necessary to seek "vengeance for the wrongs and insults" inflicted by the Arian Vandals on the orthodox church, and "the liberation of the peoples of so great a province from the yoke of slavery." The result of this liberation was to be the opportunity for the population to live "under our happy rule". There are currently two theories concerning when this goal was first formulated. According to one of them, now more widely held, the idea of recovering the West had existed in Byzantium since the end of the 5th century. This view proceeds from the thesis that, after the rise of the barbarian kingdoms professing Arianism, social elements must have persisted that did not accept the loss by Rome of its status as the great city and capital of the civilized world, and did not accept the dominant position of the Arians in the religious sphere. An alternative view, which acknowledges a general desire to return the West to civilisation and orthodox religion, dates the emergence of a programme of concrete action to after the successes in the war with the Vandals. This is supported by various indirect indications, such as the disappearance from legislation and state documents in the first third of the 6th century of words and expressions referring to Africa, Italy and Spain in one way or another, and the loss of Byzantine interest in the empire's first capital.

The well-known Byzantinist George Ostrogorsky saw the origin of Justinian's foreign policy in his religious views. In his opinion, as a Christian ruler, Justinian regarded the Roman Empire as a concept identical to the Christian world, and the victory of the Christian religion was for him as sacred a task as the restoration of Roman power.

== Justinian's military affairs ==
=== The late Roman army in the 5th–6th centuries ===
Not much is known about the organization of the armies of the Western and Eastern Roman Empires between 420 and the Anastasian War of 502–506. The army as a whole was divided into units made up of Romans and foederati. In turn, the Roman units were divided into frontier limitanei (Latin: limitanei) and comitatenses (Latin: comitatenses). (Note: This fundamental division, establishing the mutual independence of command over the field and frontier armies, was set up in the early 4th century under Constantine the Great. Maintaining two independent command systems was intended to ensure political stability in the regions.) The limitanei, under the command of duces, guarded their sections of the frontier but could, if necessary, be incorporated into field armies under the command of a magister militum. The magister officiorum presented the emperor with an annual report on the state of the limitanei forces. Service among the limitanei was considered undemanding and was passed down from father to son; they were granted plots of land in return for their service. By the 6th century, the limitanei had lost their effectiveness, and under Justinian they ceased to be counted as part of the army. This decision by Justinian was sharply criticized by Procopius in his Secret History; however, modern researchers interpret it differently, as a shift to paying only for active military service. On the basis of the available evidence, the Byzantinist Michael Whitby concluded that hereditary service among the limitanei had been reasonably attractive.

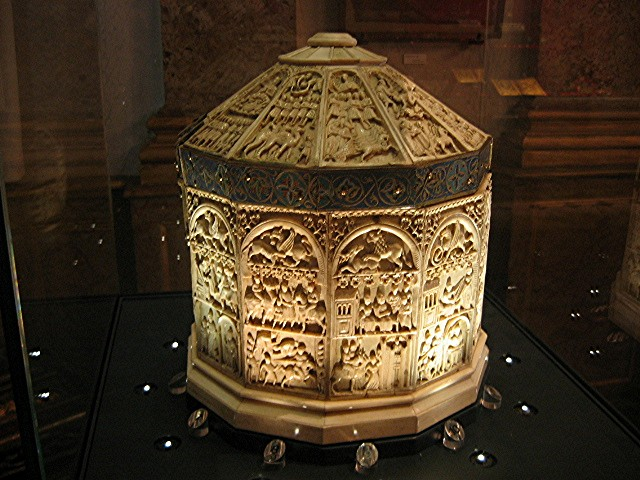
Mounted and foot Byzantine warriors on a 6th-century pyxis from the Sens Museum

The comitatenses consisted of two categories of troops: units under the command of the Latin: magister militum praesentalis, stationed in the vicinity of the capital, and provincial armies under the command of the corresponding Latin: magister militum. At the end of the 4th century there were two "presental" armies in Constantinople, three armies in the east (in Illyricum and Thracia), one army in Gaul, a small but important army in Africa, and a number of armies in the West that ceased to exist by 420. The last category of soldiers formed units of foederati (Ancient Greek: φοιδέρατοι). Their independence gradually grew, which played a role in the fall of the empire in the West. Also part of the Byzantine army's structure were units of the imperial guard — the scholae (Latin: scholae), (Note: Beginning with the reign of Zeno, the scholae performed primarily ceremonial functions. The same change occurred with the domestici.) the excubitors (Latin: excubitores), and the candidati (Latin: candidati). By the 6th century the division of the army into limitanei and comitatenses had been preserved. The term "comitatenses" was beginning to fall out of use, and in its place Procopius preferred the words stratiotai (Greek: στρατιώτες) and Ancient Greek: κατάλογοι. In reconquered Africa under Justinian, limitanei were stationed under the earlier terms of land grants.

The comitatenses were subdivided into numeri or arithmoi (Ancient Greek: Άριθμός), which formed the basic military unit of 250–500 soldiers. A larger unit was the moira (moirai) of 2,000–3,000 men, and the meros (meirai) of 6,000–7,000 men. Various theories exist regarding the predominant method of recruiting the army in Justinian's era. According to A. H. M. Jones and John Haldon, the army (at least the field army) consisted predominantly of volunteers who hoped to enrich themselves during campaigns. According to Procopius, soldiers were also entitled to pay that increased with length of service. (Note: Procopius, Secret History, XXIV.2–3.) Other researchers point to the continued existence of compulsory conscription, carried out through landowning taxpayers.

Information on the equipment worn by 6th-century Byzantine soldiers can be found in several surviving military treatises from this period or slightly later (such as the anonymous De Re Strategica and the Strategikon of Maurice), as well as in legal sources. According to these sources, a Byzantine infantryman wore armour and metal thigh guards, beneath which he wore a mail shirt almost 2 centimetres thick. The armour was worn over a thick himation cloak to protect the body from contact with the heavy armour and provide additional protection. They wore a metal helmet with a long spike on top and carried a shield with a diameter of over 1.5 metres for protection. (Note: A description of the shield is given in chapter XVI of the treatise De Re Strategica. According to this source, shields were to have a diameter of no less than seven spans. At the center of the shield was a boss, which allowed the shield to be used to strike the enemy.) His weapons consisted of a sword, a long, sharp-pointed helmet spike, (Note: De Re Strategica, XVI.) a bow, and a quiver. Some soldiers carried double-edged axes. The heavy cavalry (cataphracts) was well protected: both rider and horse were clad in iron. The horse's head was fitted with a metal frontlet, and its chest was carefully protected by a cuirass and neck guards; its hooves were shod with iron plates. (Note: De Re Strategica, XVII.) The cavalryman wore steel armor, carried a shield, and on his head wore a tall helmet adorned with a plume. His weaponry included a sword, a spear, and a quiver. There also existed a less heavily armored light cavalry, but it was of little importance and was used mainly for reconnaissance. Byzantine infantry formations were resistant to the attacks of Persian cavalry. Byzantine army tactics were based on the use of bows by both infantry and cavalry. This approach was effective in combat at a distance, but at close quarters special methods had to be applied to protect the formation.

Various methods were used to recruit the army — conscription and hereditary service for Romans, voluntary enlistment in hope of some benefit, or paid or compulsory service for non-Romans. A centralized system of recruitment took shape under the emperor Zeno (474–491). Under Justinian, a ban on military service remained in place for certain categories of the population: slaves, coloni adscripticii, curiales, and cohortales. However, references to the obligation of sons to inherit their fathers' service, and all indications of conscription, were removed from the legislation. From the few surviving documents concerning the recruitment of limitanei, it is known that this service was hereditary but not compulsory. The abolition of conscription was, in the view of A. H. M. Jones, a revolutionary change. In the British historian's view, this may have been partly connected with a deterioration of the economic situation that produced a large unemployed population, such as landless peasants. Pay for service was disbursed annually at a rate of 5–20 solidi. The supply of weapons and uniforms was a state responsibility, and under Justinian a state monopoly was established over this activity.

=== The Byzantine navy in the 5th–6th centuries ===
Little is known about the West Roman and Byzantine navy in this period, possibly owing to the absence of major naval battles. Under the rule of the Vandal king Geiseric in the mid-5th century, Roman dominance of the Mediterranean Sea had been shaken, but the Byzantine fleet dominated the eastern Mediterranean, securing Constantinople and preventing incursions from Europe into Asia and vice versa. The Ostrogoths long lacked a strong fleet, and when in 508 the emperor Anastasius I (491–518) sent a fleet of 100 warships and the same number of dromons to the shores of Italy, (Note: Marcellinus Comes, s.a. 508.) it met with no resistance. (Note: The purpose of this expedition is unknown.) This campaign may have spurred the development of an Ostrogothic navy. The navy is mentioned in connection with the actions in 515 of the general Vitalian, who rose up against the emperor Anastasius I. The rebels managed to assemble 200 ships in the ports of Thrace. Despite initial successes, their fleet was defeated by the praetorian prefect Marinus, who made active use of incendiary substances during the fighting.

In 533, taking advantage of the absence of the Vandal fleet, which was occupied in suppressing a revolt on Sardinia, a Byzantine invasion fleet consisting of 92 dromons and 500 transport ships carried an army of 15,000 soldiers under the command of Belisarius to the shores of Africa, beginning the Vandalic War. In this amphibious operation, made possible by control of Mediterranean sea lanes, the fleet played an important role in bringing supplies and reinforcements to the Byzantine expeditionary forces and garrisons. The strengthening of Byzantine naval power did not escape the notice of its opponents. In the 520s Theodoric planned to build a large fleet and send it against the Byzantines and Vandals, but his death in 526 prevented these plans from being carried out. In 535, the Byzantines began the Gothic War with an offensive on two fronts. One army, under the command of Belisarius, landed in Sicily with the aid of the fleet and then advanced into Italy, while a second army began an offensive in Dalmatia. Byzantine control of the sea was of great strategic importance, allowing a small Byzantine army to successfully seize the Italian Peninsula in 540.

In 541, however, the new Ostrogothic king Totila, having assembled a fleet of 400 ships, became a significant power in the seas around Italy, threatening Byzantine hegemony in the Mediterranean. The Byzantine fleet was twice defeated near Naples — in 542 and in 546. Belisarius personally commanded a fleet of 200 ships operating against the Gothic fleet blockading the mouth of the Tiber, in an unsuccessful attempt to relieve Rome. In 550, Totila landed on Sicily, and over the following year, with the aid of a fleet of 300 ships, seized Sardinia and Corsica, and raided Corfu and the coast of Epirus. However, his defeat in the naval battle off Sena Gallica put an end to his claims to dominance of the Mediterranean. After the final conquest of Italy and southern Spain under Justinian, the Mediterranean once again became a "Roman lake."

=== Army strength ===
One of the most complex questions concerning military affairs under Justinian is the size of his army. For comparison, figures for the size of the Roman army under Diocletian are known, as given by John Lydus. According to this evidence, the land forces at that time numbered 389,704 men, and the navy 45,562 men, giving a total of 435,266 men. To which period of that long reign these figures relate is unknown. The known strength of the armies of Constantine the Great and Maxentius in 312 was 98,000 and 188,000 men respectively. Data on the total size of the Byzantine army under Justinian are given by the 6th-century historian Agathias. Lamenting in 559 the decline of military affairs during the reign of Justinian, he writes that in former times the size of the army had reached 645,000 men, whereas in his own time it barely reached 150,000. This figure included the troops stationed in Italy, Spain and Africa, as well as on the frontier with Persia. (Note: Agathias, On the Reign of Justinian, V.13.) Agathias's estimate for the 5th century includes the lost army of the Western Roman Empire, the frontier troops (Latin: limitanei), and the Byzantine navy. If the figure given by Agathias for Justinian's army includes the troops stationed on the empire's frontiers, then the size of the field army must have been around 50,000 men. On the other hand, according to the Secret History of Procopius, under Justinian the frontier units were excluded from the regular army. (Note: Procopius, Secret History, XXIV.13.) (Note: This information relates to approximately the year 550.) Comparing various pieces of evidence, modern historians of the Byzantine army Warren Treadgold and John Haldon have made estimates of the size of the armies stationed in various regions of the empire in 559, in comparison with the figures obtained from the Notitia Dignitatum for the year 395:

Unit	Strength		
Unit	in 395	in 559	
Unit	in 395	According to W. Treadgold (1995)	According to J. Haldon (1990)
Presental army I	21,000	20,000?	20,500
Presental army II	21,000	20,000	22,500
Army of the East	20,000	20,000	25,000
Army of Thrace	24,500	20,000?	23,500
Army of Illyricum	17,500	15,000	17,500
Army of Armenia	—	15,000	15,000
Army of Italy	—	20,000?	15,000
Army of Africa	—	15,000	15,000
Army of Spain	—	5,000?	—N/a
Total	104,000	150,000	154,000

At the same time, however, A. H. M. Jones notes the difficulty of using the data of the Notitia Dignitatum, since it is not known what the size of legions and other military formations was by the end of the 4th century. W. Treadgold's estimate of troop numbers in Africa is based on the assumption that each of the five African duchies could not have fielded fewer troops than the smallest one in 395, Isauria, which fielded 2,000 soldiers. From his calculations, the researcher concludes that the empire's army, if it had diminished at all since 395, had not diminished significantly. These calculations, however, do not take into account the size of the Byzantine navy, which according to Procopius numbered 30,000 oarsmen in 532. The surviving evidence in most cases does not allow the fate of individual units to be traced over this period.

Difficulties connected with supply determined the size of the army that could be assembled at any one time. The largest army assembled in the 6th century was gathered by the rebel general Vitalian; according to Marcellinus Comes its strength was 60,000 men. Of the army raised by Anastasius for the war with Persia in 503, Procopius said that no larger army had existed before or since; the historian estimated its size at 50,000 soldiers. The ordinary size of an army was around 20,000, as was the case at the Battle of Callinicum in 530. Campaigns far from supply lines required careful preparation. Belisarius's preparations before the war with the Vandals are described by Procopius.

On the other hand, Warren Treadgold estimated the limitanei (frontier armies) at 176,000 men, which combined with the field army, would total 326,000 men. Other historians, such as John Haldon and David Alan Parnell, to name a few, have made similar estimates for the total size of the army (both frontier and field armies) at roughly 300,000.

It is likely that the Plague of Justinian, which began in 541/542, had a strong negative effect on the stability of the Byzantine military machine, although the extent of this influence is difficult to determine. In the view of the historian Michael Whitby, this catastrophic epidemic did not significantly affect the overall size of the Byzantine army, but destabilized its functioning. Data on army size for the end of the 6th century, given in the military treatise known as the Strategikon of Maurice, roughly correspond to the known figures for Justinian's reign. The shortage of troops during the reigns of Tiberius II (578–582) and Maurice (582–602) can be explained by the need to wage war on several different fronts at once. Similar problems, however, had also existed in the time of Octavian Augustus.

=== National composition of the army ===
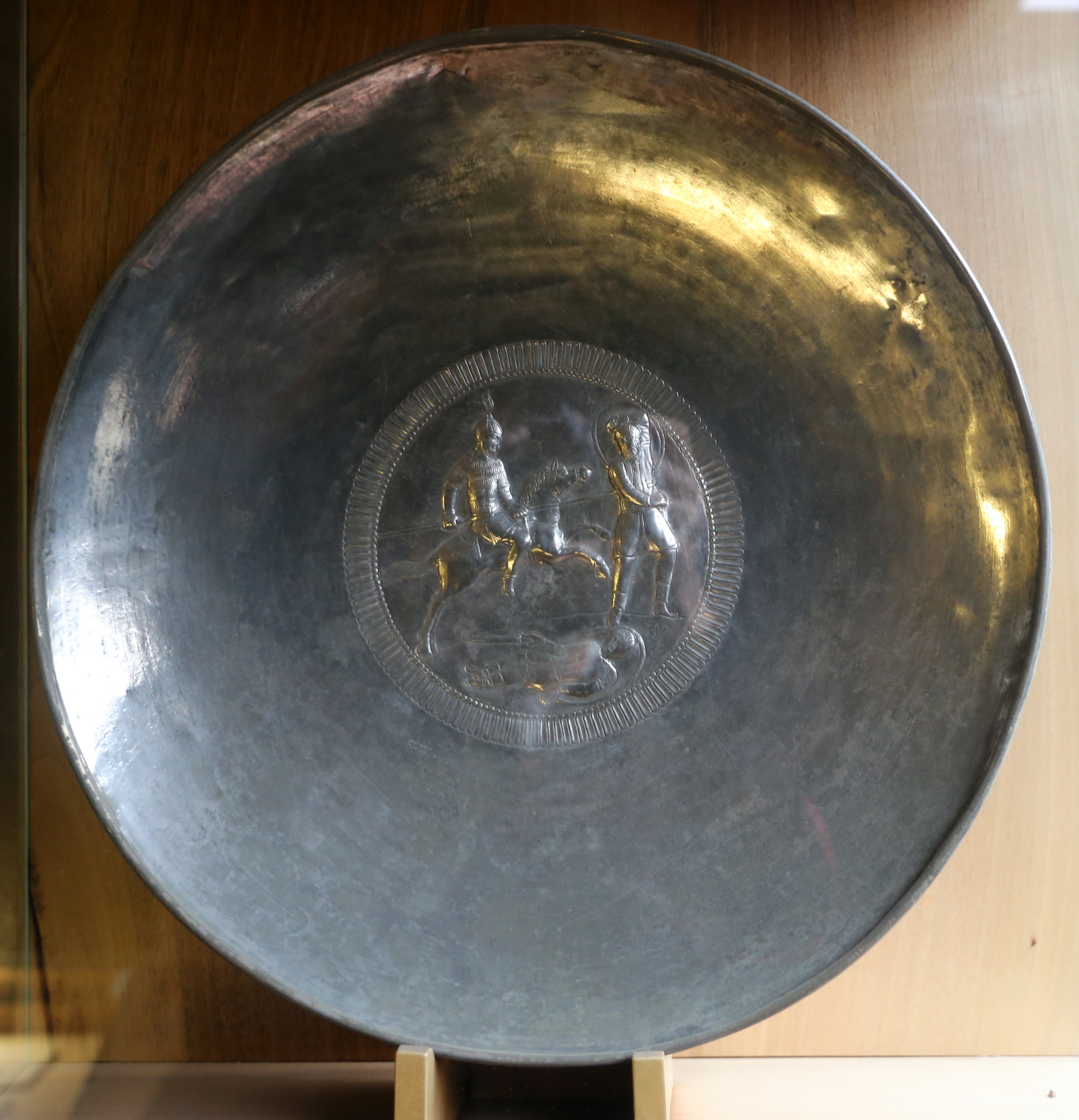
A 6th-century Byzantine horseman on a plate from the Isola Rizza treasure.

In terms of national composition, the army was recruited in such a way that no single people would have a significant preponderance. In the second half of the 5th century, soldiers from Isauria, a mountainous region in Asia Minor, were considered the most effective. Traditionally, the most combat-capable part of the army were the foederati, who during this period began to be recruited not only from barbarians but also from Romans. Procopius notes this change in connection with the Vandalic War of 533, although the exact time frame of this process is unknown. Procopius also reports that in his time the meaning of the term "foederati" had changed compared with the past, though he does not explain exactly how. Some clarification of the status of the foederati is provided by Justinian's legislation. From it, it follows that the foederati were regular troops, like the scholarii and the comitatenses. The foederati were organized into tagmata (Ancient Greek: τάγματα), commanded by Roman officers. Administratively, the foederati were subordinate to officials who paid their salaries (Latin: optiones). Gothic foederati were permitted to practice Arianism, generally forbidden within the empire.

Unlike the foederati, whose ethnic composition was not fixed, there also existed units of symmachoi (Ancient Greek: σύμμαχοι), formed exclusively from "allied" barbarians. Another avenue for non-Romans to enter military service was enlistment among the bucellarii, the personal guard of major military or civil dignitaries. This type of force is known from the end of the 4th century. Such private armies were officially permitted, since bucellarii swore an oath not only to their employer but also to the emperor. Justinian also formed ethnic units from prisoners of war and enemy deserters. The number of bucellarii depended solely on the wealth of their employer. It is known that the extremely wealthy Belisarius had as many as 7,000 at one point, whereas Narses made do with 400. Bucellarii could also be citizens of the empire. Large formations of them, such as Belisarius's, had a fairly complex structure.

The national composition of Justinian's army is a subject of debate. According to the view of Charles Diehl, with the exception of the limitanei, "no troops made up of inhabitants of the empire itself can be found in it," and accordingly the basis of the army was formed by foederati recruited from frontier barbarians. This view was shared by Ernst Stein (1919) and Louis Bréhier (1949). The opposite theory was put forward in 1912 by Jean Maspero, and was supported in 1955 by A. H. M. Jones. In their view, during this period the Byzantine army was predominantly "national" in character and was recruited from volunteers from the mountainous regions of the Balkans and Asia Minor, subjects of the empire. In those cases where chroniclers indicated the nationality of units or commanders, numerical preponderance belongs to citizens of Byzantium. Thus, of the 28 generals known by name from the period of the Iberian War of 526–532, 19 or 20 can be identified as Romans. Or, for example, at the Battle of Callinicum, only 5,000 Arabs are mentioned as the non-Roman component of a Byzantine army numbering 16,000 or 20,000 soldiers. Over the following seven years (533–540), when after the first easy successes a shortage of manpower had already begun to be felt, the Byzantine army continued to remain predominantly Roman. However, as the scale of military operations increased, it became harder to maintain the former distinction between stratiotai and foederati.

Even under the emperor Anastasius, land was granted in 512 to the Germanic tribe of the Heruli. In 528, their king accepted Christianity, and, possibly for this reason, they were granted the best lands near Singidunum. Some of the Heruli were content with the status of symmachoi, or allies, and were commanded by their own chieftains, while others chose to become foederati. Similar plans probably existed regarding the Crimean Huns (Kutrigurs), whose leader Grod was baptized in 528, but was soon overthrown by his own tribesmen. Byzantine diplomacy proved more successful with respect to the tribe of the Sabirs, whose leader Boa openly adopted a pro-Byzantine orientation and opposed those Hunnic tribes that wished to support Persia. (Note: Theophanes the Confessor, AM 6020.) Relations between Byzantium and the Arabs, an important ally in the wars with Persia, are fairly well known. From the 4th century, the Arabs were divided into two rival kingdoms, the Ghassanids, traditionally allied with Byzantium, and the Lakhmids, loyal to Persia. At the beginning of the reign of Justin I, for reasons probably of a religious character, relations between the Ghassanids and Byzantium were broken off. Soon after the war with Persia resumed with the significant participation of the Lakhmids, the Ghassanids returned to imperial service as foederati. In this capacity they took part in all the major battles of this war. Five cavalry regiments made up of Vandal prisoners, known as the Justiniani Vandali, served in the East. The burial of one of the Perso-Justiniani has been found at Grado in Italy.

== Army Command ==
=== Military hierarchy ===
The supreme commander-in-chief of the Byzantine army was the emperor, and, according to the early-tenth-century military treatise Taktika of Leo VI, only he could bear the title of strategos. In practice, the emperor rarely exercised actual command of the troops. An extensive nomenclature of offices and ranks existed for the senior command. In the sixth century the term magister militum ("master of soldiers"), introduced under Constantine the Great, was still used to designate the highest-ranking commanders, but it had already begun to be displaced by the title strategos (Ancient Greek: στρατηγός), which had emerged in the fifth century. The vast territory administered by the magister of the East (Latin: per Orientem, Ancient Greek: τῆς ἀνατολῆς) stretched from the southern coast of the Black Sea to Cyrenaica in North Africa. Under Justinian this post was held by Belisarius, Areobindus, and Buzes. In the course of the conquests, two further magistracies were created — one in Armenia (Latin: per Armeniam), covering the provinces of Armenia I, Armenia II, and Greater Armenia, and another in Africa, which incorporated the former province of Mauretania Tingitana and the islands of Sardinia and Corsica. Separate magistri also existed in the reconquered parts of Italy and Byzantine Spain. The magister had the praetorian prefect of the corresponding region subordinate to him.

The title monostrategos (Ancient Greek: μονοστρατηγός) was used rarely, to denote the extraordinary powers of a sole commander. In the East it was held by Belisarius, and it was probably also conferred on Justinian himself as commander-in-chief of all Byzantine forces during his time as Caesar under Justin I. In the sixth century the title strategos autokrator also appears — probably an analogue of the ancient Roman dictator (Latin: dictator rei gerundae causa). Describing the powers granted to Belisarius, who received this title in 532, Procopius explains: "the basileus gave him a charter granting him the right to act as he saw fit, and all his actions carried the same force as those performed by the basileus himself. Thus this charter granted him the rights of royal authority". During the campaign in Italy this title was held by Belisarius and Narses (the latter as Ancient Greek: αὐτοκράτωρ τοῦ πολέμου), as well as by Justinian's relative Germanus. Germanus's son Justin was strategos autokrator in Colchis and in Armenia. E. P. Glushanin links the use of such an extraordinary mechanism of military command as strategos autokrator to the need for a single center to coordinate field and frontier armies, as well as to the difficulty of forming large military units amid a steadily shrinking pool of conscripts.

Stratelates (Greek: στρατηλάτης) was the general term for commanders subordinate to a strategos. In the fourth and fifth centuries the term was used broadly and could, in particular, serve as a synonym for magister militum, though it gradually lost precision. Under Justinian the word was applied on various occasions to the rank held by Belisarius, by Marcellus, who was sent against the Huns, by Justinian's relative Marcian, who fought against the Moors, and by several others. Stratelates could also denote the military governor of a particular region, such as Sittas in Armenia. The title of dux, introduced under Diocletian to denote the military governor of a frontier region (a dukaton), also remained in use.

The imperial guard played an important role at court. Although the Excubitors numbered only 300 men and were occupied exclusively with guarding the imperial palace, the rank of comes excubitorum was considered extremely high, and some who held it — including Justin I — went on to ascend to the imperial throne.

=== High command ===
During his uncle's lifetime, Justinian did not seek to promote people close to him to senior command posts. Of the members of the new dynasty, only Justinian's cousin Germanus received a high military post, being appointed magister militum of Thrace. According to E. P. Glushanin, a specialist on the military nobility of early Byzantium, this was because Justinian did not want to compromise himself in any way in the eyes of the capital's population before his own accession, and also wished to avoid having rivals in the coming succession. At the same time, however, Justinian preferred to maintain good relations with the relatives of the emperor Anastasius, whose nephews Hypatius and Probus held military posts. The failures of Anastasius's generals made them harmless as political rivals. Under Justin, Hypatius was appointed magister of the East but was dismissed in 525 after the failure of negotiations over the adoption of Khosrow. It is also possible that this dismissal was instigated by Justinian, who was aware of his uncle's poor health. In the final years of Justin's reign, the promotion began of the young Belisarius and Sittas, who were entrusted with a campaign into Persarmenia. On becoming emperor, Justinian restored the post to Hypatius, before finally retiring him in 529. Belisarius was appointed to replace him as magister of the East. The chronology of the early career of Belisarius, who later became Justinian's chief general, is given inconsistently in the sources. Procopius's account, which sought to embellish the achievements of his patron, does not fully agree with the evidence of Zachariah Rhetor and John Malalas. In fact, the general's first success was the successful defense of Dara in June 530, where Belisarius commanded the Byzantine army jointly with the more experienced magister Hermogenes. Later, in repelling the Persian invasion of Commagene, Belisarius's role was already significant, but the Battle of Callinicum in the spring of 531 brought him no glory — according to Malalas, Belisarius fled, leaving command to the Huns Sunicas and Simmas. That this may be true is supported by the fact that Belisarius was replaced as magister of the East by Sittas, although Procopius attributes the defeat to the treachery of the leader of the allied Ghassanid Arabs, Arethas. Belisarius was removed from his post after a re-examination of Hermogenes's report found him personally responsible for the defeat, which differs from the manner in which Hypatius had earlier been dismissed. From this comparison, E. P. Glushanin concludes that under Justinian, military men of the older generation were relegated to the secondary role of advisers to the young officers of Justinian's "team".

Sittas's brilliant career is linked to the reforms of military administration in Armenia carried out by Justinian. After setbacks in this theater, attributed to the inability of the frontier defense entrusted to the dux of Armenia and to the local princes to withstand the Persian onslaught, Justinian abolished the post of comes and installed in Armenia a strategos, to whom he gave sufficient troops. Historians interpret differently the information found in the sources (Justinian's legislation, Procopius, and John Malalas) about how military administration in Armenia was organized at the start of Justinian's reign. According to N. G. Adontz, in 530 the dux of Armenia was Dorotheus, while the title magister militum per Armeniam et Pontum Polemoniacum et gentes was held by Sittas as commander-in-chief of the entire army. According to J. B. Bury, Sittas simultaneously held two magisteria — the Armenian and the praesentalis. According to E. P. Glushanin, Sittas was a regional strategos autokrator, with the magister of Armenia, Dorotheus, subordinate to him. In 531, Belisarius was recalled to the capital, and Mundus succeeded him as stratelates; until the conclusion of the "Perpetual Peace" with Persia in 532, Sittas held extraordinary powers in the East. The need for his functions as strategos autokrator then lapsed, and he returned to the capital. Besides Belisarius and Sittas, the "first generation" of Justinian's commanders can be said to include the Gepid Mundus, whose military and diplomatic talents helped defend Illyria until his death in 536, and the Slav Chilbudius, who fought successfully in Thrace. During the war with Persia, several non-Roman commanders rose to prominence — the Armenians Artabazes and Gilacius, the Herul Arufus, and the Hun Odalgan.

Thanks to Procopius, we know a good deal about the complex relationships among Justinian's generals, whose jealousy and intrigues often hindered the success of military operations. This was already apparent during the Vandalic War, when in 534 "slander was raised... against Belisarius before the basileus, accusing him of a desire to seize power that was wholly foreign to him". Solomon, who succeeded Belisarius as commander in Africa that same year, likewise faced hostility from his officers. Conflicts also complicated the course of the campaign in Italy and Sicily (535–561). For instance, the hostility of Belisarius and other officers toward John threatened him and his detachment with destruction. In 538, Narses, vested with special powers, refused to obey Belisarius. Intriguing against Belisarius in 538–540, his opponents accused the general before the emperor of deliberately prolonging the war against the Ostrogoths because he was plotting against Justinian. For his part, before entering Ravenna in 540, Belisarius sent the commanders hostile to him — among them the aforementioned John, Bessas, and Narses — to other parts of Italy. The prolonged conflict between Belisarius and Narses over the glory of defeating the Ostrogoths ended when Belisarius was sent east to counter the threat from the Sasanian state.

Justinian's relatives occupied a prominent place among his generals. The most notable of them was Justinian's cousin Germanus, who was permitted to marry a granddaughter of the Ostrogothic king Theodoric the Great. According to the British Byzantinist R. Browning, Germanus was regarded as a possible co-ruler and heir to Justinian, though there is no direct evidence of this. However, during the lifetime of Empress Theodora (d. 548), Justinian's relatives advanced through the ranks on the same terms as everyone else, and their ties to other members of the ruling elite were carefully monitored. The emperor's cousin Justus, and his nephew Marcellus, had rather ordinary careers. Germanus's sons, Justin and Justinian, were sent to Italy together with their father and received no distinctions after Germanus's death in 550. From the second half of the 550s, however, Justinian's policy toward his relatives changed, and in 557 Justin was made strategos autokrator, continuing to hold the highest posts until Justinian's death.

=== Military-administrative reforms ===
Under Justinian, the system of military administration in Thrace introduced under Anastasius was changed. Under that system, the troops of the region bounded by the Long Wall had been under the command of a vicarius (deputy) of the magister militum praesentalis, while responsibility for supplying that army lay with the vicar of the praetorian prefect of the East. In 535, Justinian combined military and civil administration in the capital region by creating the post of praetor of Thrace. A year later, the limitanei of the Danubian dukata were transferred to the quaestor Iustinianus exercitus, whose authority the emperor extended to Caria, Cyprus, the Cyclades, Moesia, and Scythia.

The system of dukata remained unchanged, though the number of duces was increased where necessary: from two to five in Armenia, and new dukata were created in Mesopotamia and in the new frontier provinces of Africa and Italy. In quieter provinces, where the main concerns were maintaining internal security — for example in Asia Minor and Egypt — civil and military authority were often combined in a single official. A problem province was Isauria in Asia Minor, known for its bandits, where military command was likewise transferred to the governor.

All of these changes took local conditions into account. In Africa, for example, there was no permanent army commander until 570, and a temporary general was sent there as needed to command the local forces. According to E. P. Glushanin, these reforms strengthened the civil bureaucracy and created a new category of troops that became the permanent garrisons of the newly formed provinces and were not answerable to army command. In the course of Justinian's military-administrative reforms, major changes took place in the magisterium of the East, from which an Armenian magisterium was first separated, followed later by the provinces of Asia Minor. During the main series of reforms of 535–536, military administration in Armenia was reorganized a second time, and the troops of Armenia III (formerly Armenia II) and of Pontus Polemoniacus were removed from the jurisdiction of the magister of Armenia. No administrative reforms are known for the following decade, apart from temporary changes in the eastern magisterium. The second wave of administrative legislation of 547–553 was likewise subordinated to the aims of the policy of reconquest. In 547, the Pontic diocese, abolished in 535, was re-established. In connection with the reduction in the number of troops in the East, the police post of biokolytes (Ancient Greek: βιοκωλύτης) was introduced.

Assessing the overall significance of Justinian's administrative innovations, E. P. Glushanin remarks that "their importance can hardly be overstated." In the historian's view, during this period the military elite gradually shed the magistrate-like character of its powers, and generals, increasingly relieved of administrative problems in the regions, were able to devote themselves exclusively to warfare. The temporary nature of the senior military posts gradually became a thing of the past, and Justinian's generals moved from one post to another. Only two cases of outright removal from office are known. In 554, Justinian dismissed the strategos Bessas, who had shown himself incompetent, confiscating his property and sending him into exile; and in 557 Martin, the commander of the troops in Lazica, was removed from his post as a result of intrigues. Belisarius, Buzes, and Dagisthaeus were all removed from command for short periods.

== Wars ==
=== Wars in North Africa ===
Map of the Vandalic War campaigns

As a result of the invasion of North Africa by the Germanic Hasdingi Vandals and the establishment of the Kingdom of the Vandals and Alans in 439, the Roman Empire lost territories of enormous value. North Africa was the empire's largest supplier of grain and olive oil, and its capital, Carthage, was regarded as the third city of the empire and one of its major economic, intellectual, and religious centers. Many members of the nobility of the conquered provinces were forced to flee. The Vandals, who adhered to Arianism, persecuted the Orthodox clergy, as recorded in Justinian's Novels of 534 and 535. Nevertheless, beginning with the reign of Thrasamund (496–523), a "pro-Roman" party emerged among the Vandal nobility, who had grown fond of a luxurious way of life. Under Thrasamund the Vandals ceased their raids on Byzantium, and his successor Hilderic (523–530) was, according to Procopius. Procopius also reports a rumor that Hilderic planned to hand over his kingdom to Byzantium. At the same time, there was a party opposed to such rapprochement, headed by Gelimer, who deposed Hilderic.

In the spring of 533, following the conclusion of the "Perpetual Peace" with Persia, favorable conditions arose for launching a war against the Vandal kingdom in North Africa, whose territory roughly corresponded to the borders of present-day Tunisia. The Vandal king Hilderic, who maintained friendly relations with both Justinian and the African Catholic clergy and was, moreover, a grandson of the Roman emperor Valentinian III, had been deposed by his cousin Gelimer in 530. The deposed king's supporters appealed to Byzantium for help. Justinian immediately sent an embassy to the Vandals with a message pointing out that such actions were impermissible both morally and as a departure from the succession customs established by Genseric. As a result, Hilderic and his nephews were placed under stricter confinement. Justinian then sent a second embassy to Africa with an ultimatum: either Hilderic and his nephews would be sent to Constantinople and friendship with Byzantium restored, or there would be war. In the latter case, Justinian declared himself the avenger of Genseric's insulted memory, whose provisions had been violated. In response, Gelimer rejected Justinian's interference in Vandal affairs and declared his readiness to resist. In addition to the reasons given by Procopius, scholars have identified other motives for Justinian's decision to go to war. Modern historians point to the need to divert attention from unpopular financial reforms and to soften memories of the Nika riots of 532, whose suppression had cost the lives of around 30,000 people in Constantinople. The emperor's decision may also have been influenced by complaints from refugees fleeing the Vandal-occupied territories. Justinian's plan to intervene in African affairs found no support among the senior army command, which feared a repeat of the failures of 468 and 470 (see the Battle of Cap Bon). It is also likely that his generals did not want the campaign, if successful, to enhance the influence of any of their rivals, or of the emperor himself as its instigator. Neither the generals nor the ordinary soldiers had any desire to campaign far across the sea. The highly influential official John the Cappadocian also voiced his disapproval of the undertaking, being the only courtier who dared to share his misgivings with the emperor. Nevertheless, Justinian disregarded this opposition and began the war against the Vandals.

In June 533, the general Belisarius, with a fleet of 92 dromons escorted by 500 transport ships, landed an army whose size the Russian historian P. V. Shuvalov estimates as follows:

- 2,000 sailors ("Byzantines", Ancient Greek: Βυζάντιοι) aboard the dromons; (Note: It is not known whether they returned to Constantinople after the expedition. Like part of the Excubitors, they may have remained in Africa.)
- 30,000 sailors from Egypt, the Aegean, and Cilicia aboard the transport ships;
- A landing force of 6,000 cavalry and 10,000 infantry, comprising:
  - 3,200 foederati (here Shuvalov reconstructs the figure from Procopius's account of eight tagmata of foederati, one of which is known to have numbered 400 men);
  - four tagmata of regular cavalry;
  - five infantry units of 2,000 men each;
  - 600 Huns and 400 Heruli;
  - several hundred of Belisarius's own bucellarii.

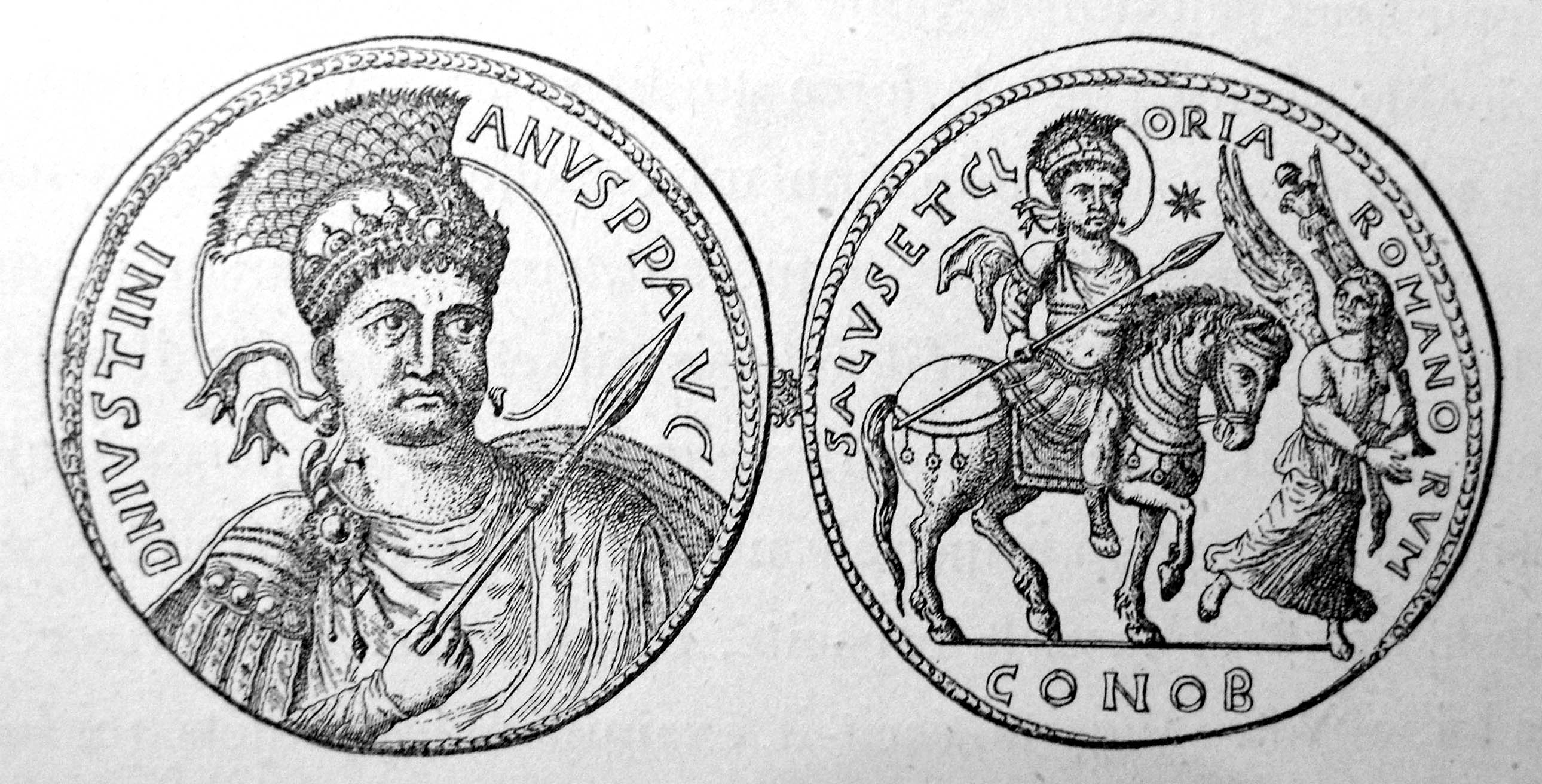
Medallion commemorating the recovery of Africa

At the same time, Pudentius raised a revolt in Tripoli, and Justinian sent him military assistance, as a result of which the Vandals lost control of the eastern part of their kingdom. Around the same time, the governor of Sardinia, Godas, declared his independence there. The Byzantines took advantage of these circumstances and completely routed the surprised Vandal army at the Battle of Ad Decimum on 13 September 533; the next day Belisarius took Carthage. Gelimer recalled 5,000 soldiers from Sardinia and attempted to besiege his former capital, while unsuccessfully trying to win over the Arian troops of the Byzantine army and the city's inhabitants. By December, having satisfied himself that the city was adequately fortified and that the Moors posed no threat from the south, Belisarius led his troops out to meet Gelimer. Twenty miles from Carthage, at the Battle of Tricamarum, the Vandal army was defeated again. The king fled into the mountains of Numidia but surrendered the following spring. In the summer of 534 he was brought to Constantinople, together with 2,000 Vandal warriors, to take part in a triumph. The same campaign also brought the annexation of Sardinia, Corsica, the Balearic Islands, and the fortress of Septem (present-day Ceuta) near the Strait of Gibraltar. For this war Justinian was awarded the victory titles Vandalicus and Africanus. Imperial clemency (Clementia) was extended to the defeated ruler, who was permitted to live a private life in Galatia. His former subjects were resettled on the empire's eastern frontiers, where they were organized into cavalry cohorts.

The praetorian prefecture of Africa was established in April 534. At the same time a military administration for Africa was set up, whose tasks included not only defending the frontiers against native tribes but also conquering the lands that had not yet been reclaimed. To maintain order once the conquest was complete, Belisarius was instructed to form units of Limitanei in Africa by enlisting soldiers from the now-defunct Kingdom of the Vandals. After the destruction of the Vandal state, the Moors, who had begun raiding Byzacena and Numidia, became a growing danger. In these clashes, Solomon, who had remained in command in Africa, initially won several victories, but in 536 a plot to assassinate him was uncovered, and he was transferred to Sicily. By the time Belisarius reached Carthage, a revolt had already broken out in Africa: led by Stotzas, it involved about 10,000 men, including 1,000 Vandals, 400 of whom had escaped deportation to the eastern provinces. The unrest spread to Sicily as well, forcing Belisarius to go there, which gave the rebels the opportunity to regroup and strengthen their forces with soldiers who had defected from the army of the dux of Numidia. Germanus was sent to suppress the revolt and achieved victory within two years. In 543, the Moors rose in revolt. A year later Solomon, who had been sent to put down the uprising, was killed, and his nephew Sergius was appointed commander in Africa, quickly becoming unpopular both with the army and among the local population. In 545, the emperor's relative Areobindus was sent to correct the situation, but this too failed to help — in 546 Carthage was captured and sacked and Areobindus was killed. At the same time the Visigoths crossed Gibraltar and attacked Septem. Success in pacifying Africa was finally achieved in 548 by John Troglita.

=== Wars with Persia ===
Toward the end of Justin I's reign, after twenty years of peace, war with Persia resumed. After the shah Kavad I increased pressure on the Kingdom of Iberia, the Iberian king Gurgenes appealed to Justin for help; Justin sent Anastasius's nephew Probus to the Crimea to bribe the Huns into aiding Iberia. Probus's mission failed because the Huns were at that time engaged in internal strife, though this later allowed Justinian to bring the Bosporan Kingdom under his control. At the same time, on Justin's orders the commander Peter assembled troops in Lazica to support Gurgenes against the invading army of Kavad, who easily overcame the opposing forces and seized the whole of Iberia. Gurgenes fled with his family and retinue to Constantinople, and from then on "the Persians did not allow them [the inhabitants of Iberia] to have their own king, and the Iberians were subject to them against their will, while great suspicion and distrust reigned between the two sides." In 526, Belisarius and Sittas undertook two campaigns into Persarmenia, one of which failed, after which, in 528, the administration of Armenia was reorganized. In 527, the war shifted to Mesopotamia, but without significant success on either side. No major fighting occurred until 530, when the Persians crossed the border. After defeating the Persians at the Battle of Dara in Mesopotamia (Note: Belisarius commanded 25,000 soldiers in this battle.) and then at the Battle of Satala in Armenia, Justinian decided to resume negotiations and was even willing to make a one-time payment to Kavad, but by the spring of 531 it became clear that the shah had decided against seeking peace. His decision may have been influenced by Armenia's defection after its heavy defeats, or by exaggerated reports of the success of the revolt in Samaria. On 19 April, at the Battle of Callinicum, both sides suffered heavy losses. After a year of border skirmishes, in the summer of 532 an "Perpetual Peace" was concluded with Kavad's successor Khosrow I, under whose terms Byzantium ceded the gold mines of Pharangium and the fortress of Bolum to Iran (which were taken by the Byzantines in the Battle of Satala), undertook to pay Persia 11,000 pounds of gold, and agreed to move the residence of the dux of Mesopotamia from Dara to Constantina, in exchange for a peace treaty of indefinite duration, pledge of mutual assistance, and the Persians' return of forts of Scanda and Sarapanis in Lazica.

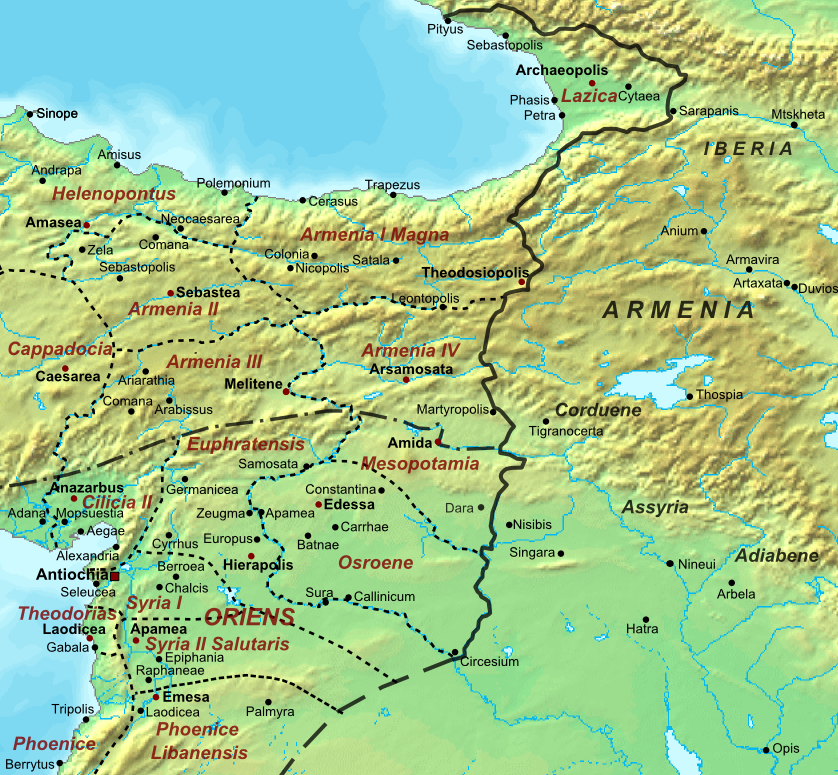
The Byzantine–Persian frontier during the Lazic War

In the late 530s hostility intensified between the Byzantine-allied Ghassanids, led by Arethas, and the Iranian-backed Lakhmids. Both sides accused each other of violating the border in the area of the Strata Diocletiana, while their respective suzerains traded accusations of poaching one another's vassals. Both the Byzantine version of events, as recorded by Procopius, and the Persian version, found in the works of Al-Tabari, have survived. Justinian probably did try to win over al-Mundhir, who indeed raided Byzantine territory. Additionally, Khosrow had been looking for a casus belli to raid Byzantine territory given that the Byzantines were preoccupied with the West. These circumstances, together with the continuing obligation to pay tribute to the Hephthalites, became the cause of a new war. In the spring of 540, a Persian army personally led by shah Khosrow I invaded Byzantine Mesopotamia. Khosrow captured Sura on the banks of the Euphrates and threatened Hierapolis, which had been abandoned by the commander Buzes along with his best troops. Several Byzantine cities either paid the Persians a ransom or were captured. The capture and destruction of Antioch — one of the empire's largest cities, which had refused to pay 10 centenaria — exposed the empire's logistics problems and Byzantium's limited ability to quickly muster an army to repel sudden attacks. As a result Justinian was forced to seek an urgent settlement, but Khosrow, blaming the Romans for the situation, demanded a large sum of money, agreeing to take on the defense of the Darial Gorge for 50 centenaria paid at once and 5 centenaria annually. The emperor did not respond that year, and the Persians withdrew from Byzantine territory. In response to Khosrow's invasion, Justinian recalled Belisarius from Italy and sent him to invade Persian territory in 541, which resulted in the capture of Sisauranon and a raid across the Tigris.

Growing discontent with Byzantine rule in South Caucasus, caused by the burdens of maintaining the frontier army and by attempts of Byzantine officials to profit from the local population, led the Lazic king Gubazes II to ask Khosrow, in the early 540s, to take Lazica under his full control. The shah accepted the offer and, having captured a number of fortresses in 541, including the recently founded Petra, established his control over the region. Taking advantage of the fact that the main Persian forces were fighting in Palestine in 542, a 30,000-strong Byzantine army invaded Persarmenia and attempted to capture its capital, Dvin, but achieved no success owing to a lack of unified command. The Persians, for their part, managed only to capture and destroy Callinicum after unsuccessful attacks on Sergiopolis and Dara, since Belisarius had by then managed to gather substantial forces at Dura-Europos. This same year saw the onset of the Plague of Justinian. In 543, the Persians were again active in the Caucasus, achieving successes in Caucasian Albania despite the raging epidemic. Following the Persians' unsuccessful siege of Edessa in 544, the city bought off the Persians with 5 centenaria of gold, and five-year truce was concluded, under which the Romans paid 20 centenaria in exchange for peace. The truce did not end the hostility between the Byzantine-backed Ghassanids and the Persian-backed Lakhmids, and in the war that broke out between them in 546 victory went to the Ghassanid ruler Arethas. Around 547 the Himyar king Abraha undertook, at Justinian's request, a campaign against Persia. None of these actions, however, led to a breach of the truce, which was extended several more times until peace was concluded in 562.

Defecting from Byzantium did not bring Lazica the peace and prosperity it had expected. Having established their control over the region, the Persians resumed imposing Zoroastrianism and even planned to expel the local population and resettle the country with Persians. Fearing for his life, Gubazes appealed to Justinian for help and allied himself with the Alans and the Sabirs. In 549, Justinian sent an army of 8,000 men under Dagisthaeus, who inflicted several severe defeats on the Persians, but in the early 550s the Persian commanders Mermeroes and Nakhoragan had achieved several successes as well. The Byzantine commander Bessas retook Petra in 551, and the final battle of the Lazic War ended in a major Byzantine victory. A truce was concluded in 557, and in 561/562 (Note: The exact date of the treaty is disputed.) the Fifty-Year Peace was signed, by which Khosrow recognized Lazica as a Byzantine possession in exchange for an annual payment in gold. One of the issues discussed during the peace negotiations was the status of Svaneti, then part of Lazica, but on this the two sides failed to reach agreement.

=== War with the Ostrogoths ===
==== Course of the war ====
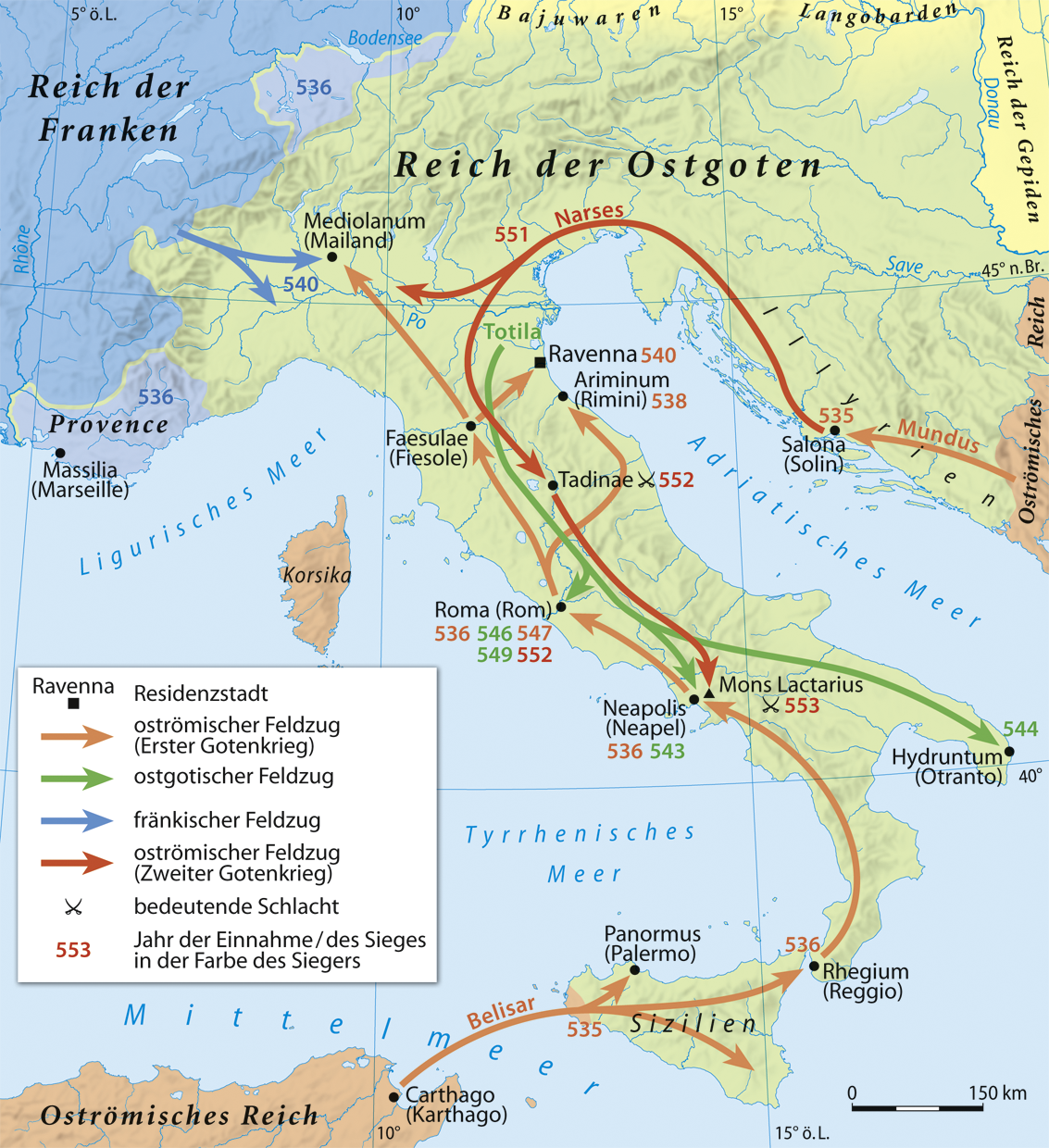
The Byzantine–Gothic Wars, 535–554

As in the African Vandal state, by the early 530s the Ostrogothic Kingdom contained parties both for and against closer ties with Byzantium. Relations between the two states, which had been good for most of the reign of Theodoric the Great (493–526), deteriorated in the last years of the Ostrogothic king's rule. The executions of the pro-Byzantine Boethius in 524 and of Symmachus the following year were felt keenly in Constantinople. After Theodoric's death, power passed to his daughter Amalasuintha, who became regent for the young king Athalaric (526–534). Both Procopius and Cassiodorus describe Amalasuntha's pro-Byzantine orientation. Under her, important concessions were made to the Roman Senate and to the Orthodox clergy. This policy of rapprochement with Byzantium provoked opposition among the Ostrogothic military nobility. With the start of the Vandalic War, Amalasuntha supported Justinian by allowing Belisarius to supply his army with provisions from Sicily; she also provided horses and bases from which to attack the Vandal kingdom. As a result, once the Vandals had been defeated, the Ostrogothic kingdom lost an ally, and Amalasuntha's government faced even greater resentment from the opposition. Given Athalaric's fatal illness and aware of the precariousness of her own position, Amalasuntha conducted secret negotiations about ceding power in Italy to Justinian. However, after Athalaric's death on 2 October 534, Amalasuntha chose instead to make her cousin Theodahad co-ruler, a candidate who seemed acceptable to both the Ostrogothic nobility and the Roman Senate. Despite all of Amalasuntha's attempts to make Theodahad her ally, after coming to power he had her imprisoned in October 534 and ordered her killed on 30 April 535. According to most sixth-century historians (Procopius, Jordanes, and Marcellinus Comes), it was this murder that constituted the main cause of the war between Byzantium and the Ostrogothic Kingdom.

Thanks to the work of Procopius, who served as Belisarius's secretary during this campaign, the Byzantine–Gothic Wars are the best-documented of all the wars fought by Byzantium. According to the historian, the offensive was launched on two fronts: while Mundus advanced in the north in Dalmatia, Belisarius invaded Sicily. Meeting resistance only at Palermo, Belisarius continued his advance northward. In the spring of 536, Naples was taken after a three-week siege. By this time Theodahad had been replaced as military leader by the more suitable Vitiges, who became the first Ostrogothic king not belonging to the Amali family. In December 536 Theodahad was killed, and an embassy was sent to Constantinople with news of this and a proposal of peace, but the moment for such a step had already passed. The position of the Franks was an important factor at this time. Following the death of Theodoric the Great, they had shown interest in reclaiming the Ostrogothic possessions in Gaul, and at the start of the war they promised aid to Belisarius. However, in 536, Theodahad managed to secure their support by returning the disputed territories. Nevertheless, this alliance was unreliable, and Vitiges had to reckon with the possibility of an invasion from the north. As a result, Vitiges was forced to retreat, allowing the Byzantines to take Rome without a fight on 9 December. On learning of this, Vitiges assembled a large army — estimated by Procopius at 150,000 men — and began a blockade of Rome in late February. Seeing the enemy's numerical superiority, Belisarius requested reinforcements. Meanwhile Byzantine successes elsewhere in Italy made the siege more difficult for the Goths, and the military and diplomatic successes of the general John threatened the Ostrogothic capital, Ravenna. As a result, after a year-long siege, the Goths abandoned their positions around Rome in mid-March 537. The subsequent course of events is not entirely clear, but the arrival in Italy of Narses with a new army did not improve the Byzantine position, since tension between the two generals, Belisarius and Narses, hampered the conduct of the campaign. Narses was regarded as a friend of Justinian and Theodora, which undermined Belisarius's authority. Further reinforcements reached Liguria, enabling the capture of Milan, but the Ostrogoths, supported by 10,000 Burgundians, soon retook the city, razed it to the ground, and killed 300,000 of its inhabitants. Because of the conflict between his generals, Justinian recalled Narses in the spring of 539. At the same time Vitiges sent an embassy to Khosrow, trying to persuade the Persians that Byzantium, in seeking to conquer the whole world, posed a threat to them as well. Aware of this, Justinian considered making peace with the Goths, but in 540 Belisarius achieved major successes. After first taking the well-fortified fortress of Osimo, he laid siege to Ravenna. Vitiges's hopes for Frankish assistance proved futile, and Justinian offered him peace on terms establishing the border between the two states along the Po river. Upon Belisarius' refusal to sign the treaty, some of the city's inhabitants conceived the idea of proclaiming Belisarius emperor of the Western Roman Empire. Belisarius, pretending to accept the arrangement, entered Ravenna in May 540 and, taking advantage of his position, seized the city. However, word of Belisarius's apparent agreement reached Justinian, who ordered the general to return to Constantinople, where he fell into disfavor.

While hostilities against Persia continued, military resources were diverted eastward and the situation in Italy deteriorated. The troops' pay was poorly maintained, which affected the morale of the Byzantine army. Ildibad, chosen as king, restored control over the territory north of the Po but was killed in 541. In the spring of 542б King Totila won a significant victory at Faventia, after which the Ostrogoths regained many cities in southern Italy and soon took control of almost the entire peninsula. Belisarius was recalled from the eastern front but, owing to Theodora's opposition, remained in the capital for some time before being sent to Italy at the end of 544. He was not given substantial forces, and his requests for reinforcements went unanswered. In December 545 Rome was besieged, and Belisarius was unable to relieve the city, which was taken by the Goths in December of the following year. Totila wished to destroy the city and turn it into pastureland, but confined himself to expelling its inhabitants. Rome stood deserted for forty days until it was reoccupied by Belisarius's troops. Eventually, in 548, Belisarius was relieved of his command in Italy. With his departure, matters in Italy grew even worse. In 549, the Goths besieged Rome again and took it in January 550. That same year Germanus was appointed to Italy but died on the way there. In his place, the elderly Narses was appointed commander in Italy and given enormous financial resources. A new army of 30,000 men, together with allied Lombards, reached Ravenna in June 552. The Ostrogoths were unable to defend their capital, but Totila continued his resistance, raiding the coasts of Greece. At the end of June the decisive Battle of Taginae was fought, in which up to 6,000 Goths, along with their king, were killed. This battle is regarded as an important milestone in the art of war, demonstrating the successful use of pike- and bow-armed infantry against cavalry. After Taginae, pockets of resistance remained in some parts of Italy, but the war was essentially over.

==== Forces of the sides ====
The question of the size of the Byzantine army in the war with the Ostrogoths has been thoroughly studied. Discussing the forces at Belisarius's disposal when he landed in Sicily in 535, Procopius gives a figure of 7,500 men, distributed as follows: 4,000 regular soldiers, 500 allies (200 Huns and 300 Moors), and 3,000 Isaurians. In addition, the expeditionary corps included an unspecified number of the general's personal guard. (Note: According to P. V. Shuvalov, there were 7,000 of them.) Elsewhere Procopius mentions 7,000 cavalry drawn from Belisarius's own estates. Depending on whether Belisarius is thought to have taken all of his men to Sicily (L. M. Hartmann, 1923) or only some of them (J. B. Bury, 1923; E. Stein, 1949), estimates of the Byzantine army range from 8,000 to 15,000 men. However, the figure of 7,000 relates to the year 542. Comparing this with Procopius's account of the Gothic siege of Rome in 537–538, when Belisarius had only 5,000 soldiers at his disposal, the Danish historian K. Hannestad estimates Belisarius's own retinue at 1,000–1,500 men and the entire Byzantine army in Italy at 9,000 men. After the Gothic king Vitiges besieged Rome, Constantinople realized that the forces sent to Italy were insufficient. In April 537 reinforcements of 1,600 Hunnic cavalry were sent, and in early December a further 4,800 soldiers (3,000 Isaurian infantry, 800 Thracian cavalry, and 1,000 regular cavalry troops (ἐκ τῶν καταλόγων)). Finally, in the summer of 538 Narses's army arrived, numbering between 7,000 and 8,000 men, of whom 2,000 were Heruli, who left Italy with Narses in the spring of 539. Thus, with Narses's reinforcements, Byzantine forces in Italy reached approximately 21,000 men. At the same time, another Byzantine army was operating in Illyria and Dalmatia, which was most likely not included in the figures above. Thus, Procopius's direct data do not allow an estimate of the total size of the Byzantine army, though the estimate can be refined using data on Byzantine losses. According to K. Hannestad's estimate, Byzantine losses killed or through desertion in the fighting up to early 537 may have amounted to 2,000 men; thus Procopius's figure of 5,000 men for the defenders of Rome in 537–538 is quite plausible, which was insufficient to defend the 19 km of the city walls. These figures are corroborated by Procopius's data on the size of Byzantine detachments in individual skirmishes during the siege. In the spring of 538 the general John attacked Picenum with 2,000 cavalry, and Belisarius's army reached its maximum size in the spring of 539 during the siege of Osimo. On the whole, although the figures given by Procopius for the first phase of the Gothic War cannot be independently verified, they are not mutually contradictory.

In the summer of 540 Belisarius left Italy, apparently taking part of the army with him. As a result, when hostilities resumed in the spring of 542, Byzantium had only 12,000 men at its disposal, to which should be added 4,000–5,000 soldiers stationed in garrisons. This number was deemed insufficient, and reinforcements were sent the following year. In 544, Belisarius was sent to Italy for a second time, leading reinforcements of 4,000 Thracians. In the winter of 545–546 another detachment, of unknown size, was sent. Thus, the maximum size of the Byzantine army in Italy at that time can be estimated at between 20,000 and 25,000. After the arrival of several large detachments between 548 and 552, whose numbers Procopius records, the army may have reached 40,000, of which about 6,000 could have been made up of garrison troops overall. These calculations, however, do not take losses into account. K. Hannestad estimates direct losses during the second phase of the Gothic War at 7,000–8,000 men. The number of deserters is harder to establish, but it was considerable. For instance, reporting to Justinian on the results of the 545–546 winter campaign, Belisarius complained that most of his soldiers had defected to the enemy. In 554, during the decisive battle with the Ostrogoths, Narses's army numbered 18,000 men according to Agathias. However, according to the historian W. Treadgold, this was only part of Narses's total force, which numbered around 20,000 men.

Regarding the size of the Ostrogothic army, various estimates exist, based on different methods of assessing the population of the Ostrogothic Kingdom. The basic figure used is the well-known estimate of the total Ostrogothic population at the time of the conquest of Italy in 488 — 250,000. Most researchers take the ratio of army size to total population as 1:5. Thus, for example, Edward Gibbon at the end of the eighteenth century estimated the size of the Gothic army in 535 at 200,000, out of a total population of 1,000,000, while F. Dahn in 1861 estimated the army's size at 150,000. Modern estimates start from a substantially smaller Gothic population in 488 and accordingly give a smaller size for the Gothic army in the late 530s: Ottorino Bertolini, between 20,000 and 40,000 (1941); E. Stein, fewer than 40,000 (1949); W. Ensslin, between 20,000 and 25,000 (1959).

=== Wars in the Crimea and the Balkans ===
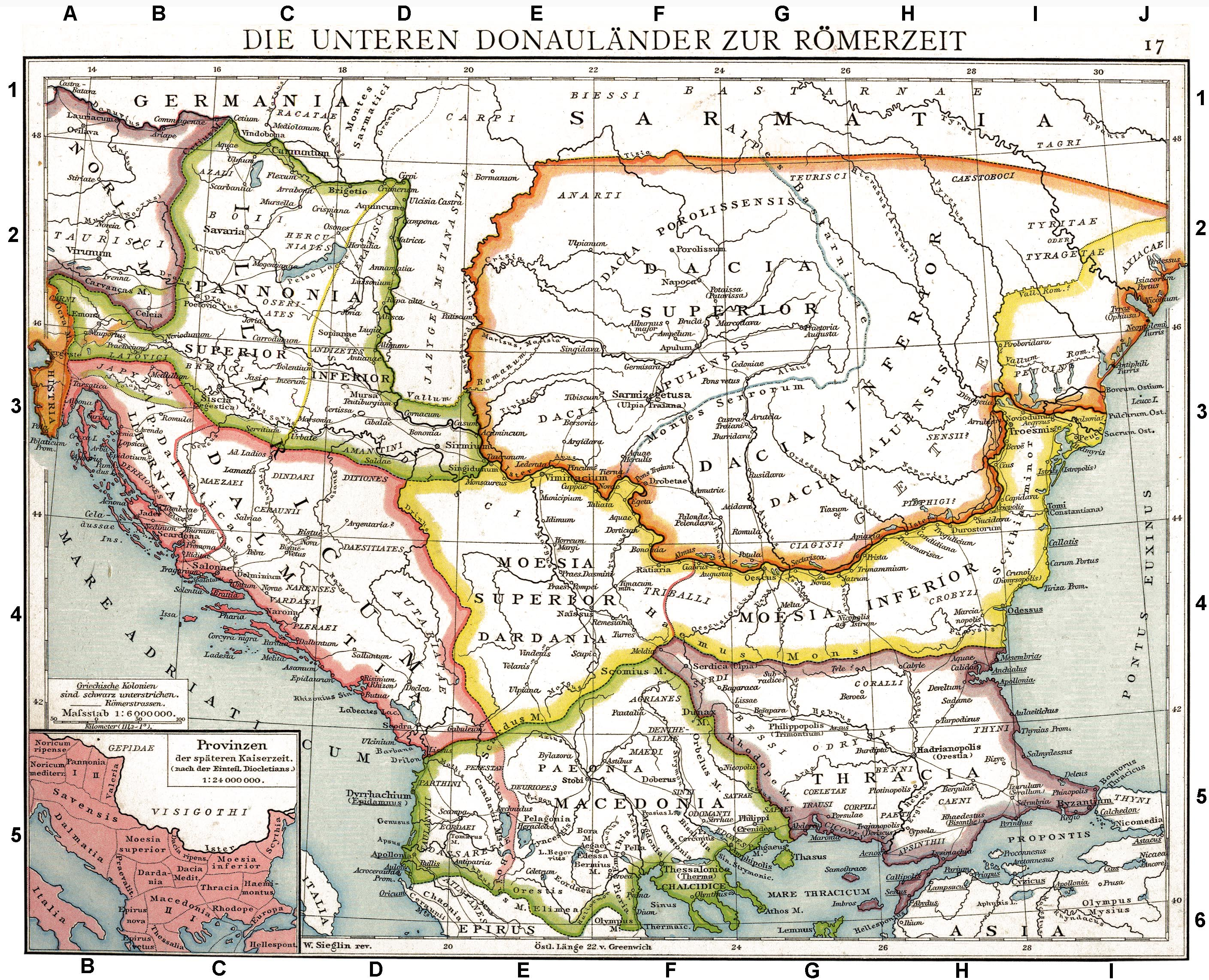
Roman provinces of the Balkans. Map from the 1886 edition of the Allgemeiner Historischer Handatlas

The various parts of the Balkan Peninsula held differing significance for Byzantine policy. The northwestern part of the Balkans, which had passed to the Western Roman Empire after the division of 395 and included the province of Dalmatia and the Diocese of Pannonia, attracted the attention of the Constantinople government rarely in the fifth and sixth centuries, mainly in connection with interventions in the affairs of the Ostrogothic Kingdom and threats to Byzantium's own possessions in this part of Europe. The defense of Byzantium's own province of Thracia, located in the southeast, was, by contrast, of great importance for the security of Constantinople.

Gepid Kingdom Lombard Kingdom Byzantine Empire Ostrogothic Kingdom Slavs Territories held by the Gepids in the mid-sixth century, and neighboring peoples

In 505, having made peace with Persia, Emperor Anastasius decided to check the attempts of the Ostrogothic king Theodoric the Great to establish himself in Illyria, but in several battles the Byzantine army, together with its Gepid allies, was defeated. The Gepids, for their part, had their own interest in opposing the Ostrogoths, since they were engaged in a long-running conflict with them over possession of Sirmium. From the late fifth century, another Byzantine ally in Illyria was the Heruli, who had been defeated by the Lombards. Under Anastasius they became foederati, but under the same emperor they lost this status, regaining it in 528 when their king converted to Christianity. They were granted land for settlement in the vicinity of Bassianae. Around this time they were joined, with his own army, by the Gepid prince Mundus, who had previously fought successfully on Theodoric's side. In 527/528, at Byzantine instigation, a third Gepid–Ostrogothic war broke out over Sirmium. The combined army of the Gepids and Heruli was defeated by the Ostrogoths under Vitiges. The Ostrogoths pursued their enemy as it fled into Moesia Prima, where they sacked the city of Gratiana. The retreating Gepids, in turn, plundered the local Roman population. After these events Mundus entered Byzantine service and was appointed magister of Illyria. Byzantium's relations with the Gepids were complicated by the fact that Byzantium also laid claim to the recovery of Sirmium for itself.

The situation was complicated further by large-scale invasions, beginning in the 520s, of proto-Turkic Oghur and proto-Slavic peoples living north of the Danube. Throughout Justinian's reign the Balkans continued to suffer from their raids. Justinian pursued a defensive policy toward these peoples, assigning a large role to diplomacy and to fortress-building. In 528, simultaneously with the intensification of hostilities against Persia in the Caucasus, an expedition was sent against the "Huns" in the Crimea. John Malalas and Theophanes the Confessor report on its causes. According to these chroniclers, the "king of the Huns" Gordas had earlier visited Constantinople and converted to Christianity. On his return he began spreading Christianity in his kingdom and destroying idols, but was killed by his brother Muagerus. In response, Justinian sent a large army by sea and by land, which included allied Ostrogoths under Baduarius and Godilas, and established control over the Crimea without a battle. Baduarius, having barely returned from the Crimea, was sent to repel an invasion of Turkic-Oghur nomads, whom Malalas calls "Huns" and whom Theophanes the Confessor identifies as Bulgars. Together with Justin, dux of Moesia Secunda, he suffered a defeat, but after 529, the situation in this theater improved, which is attributed to the successful military and diplomatic activity of Mundus, who had entered Byzantine service. During this same period Chilbudius operated successfully against the Sclaveni in Thrace.

After the start of the Byzantine war against the Ostrogoths in 535, Sittas won a victory over the Bulgars at the Yantra; that same year Sirmium was also taken by Byzantium, but the following year the city again fell into Gepid hands. In 536 Mundus succeeded in capturing Salona, the capital of Dalmatia, but was killed defending it. After his death, and the Gepids' refusal to return Sirmium, Justinian stripped the tribe of its status as foederati and stopped paying them subsidies. Because the army was occupied in Italy, the empire's capacity for a military response was limited, but the neighboring towns were fortified. The Heruli, who lived south of Sirmium, were enlisted in the struggle against the Gepids. Diplomatic contacts with the Lombards began. The Gepids, in turn, allied themselves with the Franks and the Ostrogoths and defeated the Byzantines under the magister Calluc. In Thrace, the weakness of the garrison resulting from the abolition of the magisterium there led to repeated invasions of the region. In 540, the "Huns" reached the outskirts of Constantinople. Since it was impossible to fight the Bulgars and the Gepids effectively at the same time, around 540 the foederati treaty with the Gepids was renewed and payments resumed.

At the same time, relations with the Lombards continued. In 545/546, they were granted Pannonia Prima and Pannonia Valeria, and were later offered subsidies. In 546, Narses was able to repel a raid by Slavs who had invaded Thrace only with the help of recently hired Heruli. The Slavs invaded the empire again the following winter, in 547/548, reaching as far as Epidamnus. In 549, Byzantine diplomatic efforts resulted in the outbreak of war between the Gepids and the Lombards, in which Justinian sided with the weaker Lombards. Byzantium took a substantial part in this conflict, sending north a total of 15,000 soldiers, including 1,500 Heruli and 3,000 other allies. The Germanic peoples, however, chose not to begin hostilities, and the Gepid king Thurisind soon concluded a truce with the Lombard leader Audoin.

In 550, a new war between the Gepids and the Lombards ended with a two-year peace, but before the peace was concluded the Gepids sought help from the proto-Turkic Oghur proto-Bulgar Kutrigurs, whom they then directed against Byzantine territory. This raid was averted through diplomatic efforts. Justinian then continued his policy of supporting both the Gepids and the Lombards. In the winter of 550 the Slavs, splitting into two detachments, plundered Illyricum and Thrace. That summer, only the presence at Serdica of Germanus with an army preparing to depart for Italy prevented the Slavs from raiding Thessalonica. However, once the army had withdrawn to winter quarters at Salona, the Slavs were able to reach Adrianople unopposed.

In 552, with Byzantine military support, the Lombards were able to win an important victory at the Battle of Asfeld, though the timely withdrawal of the Byzantines prevented this victory from being complete. As a result of the severe weakening of both sides, Justinian was able to recover the lost parts of the provinces of Dacia Ripensis and Moesia Superior, though not Sirmium. The northern Balkans then remained quiet for the rest of Justinian's reign. In 558, the Kutrigurs, led by khan Zabergan, carried out several raids on Constantinople, but the elderly Belisarius, at the head of 300 palace guards, the city militia, and local peasants, managed to defend the city walls. In 558, the empire gained new allies in the northern Black Sea region in the form of the Avars, who had arrived there from the east; with their help Byzantium was able to break up the Bulgar confederation and defeat the Antes in the steppes between the Don and the Danube. As they advanced westward, the Avars settled north of the Danube in the early 560s and began receiving subsidies from Byzantium. The revival of Byzantine defensive capacity in Thrace began only after the conclusion of all the wars in the West and East in the early 560s, and the Gepid problem was finally resolved only under Justin II.

=== War in Spain ===
Byzantine Spain, 565–586

Like the other Germanic kingdoms, the Visigothic Kingdom was in a state of crisis by the time of the Byzantine invasion. In 508, the Visigoths had suffered a defeat at Vouillé at the hands of the Franks, and during the reign of King Theudis (531–548) the threat to Tarraconensian Spain persisted. Belisarius's army operating in Africa also posed a threat. In order to secure themselves on that front, the Visigoths attempted to seize Septem on the African coast, but were unable to hold the city, which was eventually recovered by the Byzantines. In 548, Theudis was killed, and he was followed by the short-lived Theudigisel. Under King Agila I (549–554), unrest intensified among the Hispano-Romans, who were influential in Baetica. After a coup in Córdoba in 550, the king fled to Emerita Augusta (modern Mérida), which became the seat of his new court. A few months later Athanagild laid claim to the throne, supported by the Roman aristocracy of Baetica. Athanagild appealed to Justinian for help, and in the summer of 552 the emperor sent 2,000 men to Spain under the eighty-year-old Liberius, who had served the Ostrogothic king in Italy since the 490s. Near Hispalis, the combined army of Liberius and Athanagild defeated Agila. Agila, who had taken refuge in Emerita Augusta with his army, was killed by his own former supporters. The Byzantines confidently took Carthago Nova and other cities in southeastern Spain, after which they established the province of Byzantine Spain, occupying a narrow strip of Baetica and Carthaginiensis.

== Results ==
Territorial conquests of the Eastern Roman Empire under Justinian I. Shown in red are the territories as of 527 (beginning of the reign) and in orange as of the date of the emperor's death — 565

Justinian's conquests destroyed some of the barbarian kingdoms that had arisen on the territory of the Roman Empire. Having concentrated on wars with the Vandals, Ostrogoths and Visigoths, the empire found itself vulnerable to invasions by new, more dangerous barbarians — the Slavs, Avars, Lombards and others, a fact that was already clear to Justinian's contemporaries. The initial success in Italy and Africa was considerable, but it is telling that in the volume of Procopius of Caesarea's historical work devoted to the war with the Vandals, the military victory occurs roughly halfway through the narrative, with the remainder of the account describing the struggle against the various conspiracies and revolts that arose in the conquered territories. The events of the last years of Justinian's reign showed that Constantinople itself was not safe from barbarian attacks from the north. Even Menander Protector, who took a favourable view of Justinian's rule, noted that in his old age the emperor had become too weak in body and spirit, otherwise he would have been able to defeat the Avars. Under Justinian's successors — Justin II (565–578), Tiberius II (578–582) and Maurice — the empire increasingly faced a shortage of manpower and almost lost the ability to wage war on several fronts simultaneously. Researchers attribute the causes of this phenomenon to the decline in discipline of the barbarized army, demographic changes resulting from devastating epidemics, and a reduction in the barbarians available for recruitment.

In his eastern policy Justinian showed considerable moderation. Unlike his predecessors and successors, he did not aim to destroy the Sasanian Empire, relying instead, wherever possible, on diplomatic and economic measures. Justinian made significant efforts to restore the eastern provinces, which had suffered serious damage after the war of 540. However, the substantial payments to the Persians to which Justinian agreed became one of the reasons for the outbreak of the new war in 572 — according to the sources, the emperor Justin II was simply no longer willing to pay the sums promised to the shah.

In his effort to restore the Roman Empire, Justinian placed a heavy strain on the resources available, without taking into account the changed circumstances and realities of the sixth century. Under Justinian, Byzantium reached its greatest territorial extent, uniting within it almost the entire Mediterranean. However, as G. A. Ostrogorsky opines, this territorial growth lacked a solid foundation, and so the consequences of Justinian's restorative efforts "were doubly severe. After all his outstanding successes, Justinian left to his successors a state that was internally exhausted and economically and financially disordered".

On the other hand, with regard to the long term consequences of Justinian's conquests, the provinces of Italy, North Africa and Spain were some of the wealthiest provinces of the Roman Empire, and thus it would not be unreasonable to assume that those provinces would make a substantial contribution to the empire's coffers given that these provinces were highly taxable. Peter Sarris suggests that Justinian's efforts were hampered by the plague and as a result it made reconquering the West harder and costlier. According to some historians, despite the scale of destruction caused by the conquests, North Africa and Southern Italy generally paid for themselves and yielded substantial profit for the empire. The conquests in the West also expanded Byzantine influence over the papacy and added a source of Germanic warriors for recruitment in the army.

== Bibliography ==
=== Primary sources ===
- Agathias (1953). О царствовании Юстиниана [On the Reign of Justinian]. Translated, with an introduction and notes, by M. V. Levchenko. Moscow–Leningrad: Izdatel'stvo AN SSSR.
- Bolgov, N. N. (2010). Марцеллин Комит. Хроника [Marcellinus Comes. Chronicle]. Belgorod: (Unknown).
- Kuchma, V. V. (2007). О стратегии. Византийский военный трактат VI века [On Strategy: A Sixth-Century Byzantine Military Treatise]. Byzantine Library: Sources. Saint Petersburg: Aleteia. p. 160. ISBN 978-5-903354-17-7.
- Procopius (1996). Война с готами [History of the Wars: The Gothic War]. Moscow: Arktos. p. 167.
- Theophanes the Confessor (1884). Летопись византийца Феофана от Диоклетиана до царей Михаила и сына его Феофилакта [The Chronicle of Theophanes the Byzantine, from Diocletian to the Emperors Michael and His Son Theophylact]. Moscow: (Unknown).
- Prokopios (2014). The Wars of Justinian. Trans. by H. B. Dewing, revised by A. Kaldellis. Indianapolis: Hackett Publishing Company, Inc. p. 642. ISBN 978-1-62466-170-9.
- Dodgeon, Michael H.; Lieu, Samuel N. C. (2002). The Roman Eastern Frontier and the Persian Wars AD 363—628. New York: Routledge. p. 408. ISBN 0-203-99454-X.

=== Researches ===
==== In English ====
- Bury, J. B. (1889). History of the Later Roman Empire from Arcadius to Irene. Vol. I. London: Macmillan and Company. p. 482.
- M. Maas, ed. (2005). The Cambridge Companion to the Age of Justinian. Cambridge: Cambridge University Press. p. 533. doi:10.1017/CCOL0521817463. ISBN 978-0-521-52071-3.
  - Greatrex, G. (2005). "Byzantium and the East in the Sixth Century". In M. Maas (ed.). The Cambridge Companion to the Age of Justinian. Cambridge: Cambridge University Press. pp. 477–509.
  - Pohl, W. (2005). "Justinian and the Barbarian Kingdoms". In M. Maas (ed.). The Cambridge Companion to the Age of Justinian. Cambridge: Cambridge University Press. pp. 448–476.
- Cameron, Averil (1985). Procopius and the Sixth Century. New York: Routledge & Kegan Paul. p. 308. ISBN 0-415-14294-6.
- Elton, H. (2007). "Army and Battle in the Age of Justinian (527–65)". In Ed. by P. Erdkamp (ed.). A Companion to the Roman Army. Malden and Oxford: Wiley-Blackwell. pp. 532–550.
- Haldon, J. F. (1990). Byzantium in the Seventh Century. Cambridge: Cambridge University Press. p. 492. ISBN 0-521-26492-8.
- Jones, A. H. M. (1964). The Later Roman Empire 284–602. Vol. II. Norman: University of Oklahoma Press.
- Kazhdan, A. (1981). "John F. Haldon, Recruitment and Conscription in the Byzantine Army c. 550–950. A Study on the Origins of the Stratiotika Ktemata". Revue des études byzantines (review). 31 (1). Paris: Institut français d'études byzantines: 338–339.
- Liebeschuetz, J. H. W. G. (1990). Barbarians and Bishops. Oxford: Clarendon Press. pp. 43–47. ISBN 0-19-814886-0.
- Merrils, A.; Miles, R. (2010). The Vandals. Malden: Wiley-Blackwell. p. 351. ISBN 978-1-4051-6068-1.
- Moorhead, J. (1994). Justinian. The Medieval World. Harlow: Longman. p. 202. ISBN 0-582-06304-3.
- Kaegi, Walter (1981). Byzantine Military Unrest, 471–843: An Interpretation. Amsterdam: Adolf M. Hakkert. p. 373. ISBN 90-256-0902-3.
- Kazhdan, Alexander, ed. (1991). The Oxford Dictionary of Byzantium. Oxford University Press.
- Norwich, John Julius (1988). Byzantium: The Early Centuries. London: Penguin Books.
- Parnell, D. A. (2015). "The Social Networks of Justinian's Generals". Journal of Late Antiquity. 8 (1). Baltimore: JHU Press: 114–135.
- Pryor, J. H.; Jeffreys, E. M. (2006). The Age of the ΔΡΟΜΩΝ: The Byzantine Navy ca. 500–1204. Leiden: Brill Academic Publishers. p. 754. ISBN 978-90-04-15197-0.
- Rance, P. (2005). "Narses and the Battle of Taginae (Busta Gallorum) 552: Procopius and Sixth-Century Warfare". Historia: Zeitschrift für Alte Geschichte. 54 (4). Stuttgart: Franz Steiner Verlag: 424–472. JSTOR 4436789.
- Ripoll, G. (2000). "On the Supposed Frontier between the Regnum Visigothorum and Byzantine Hispania". The Transformation of Frontiers: From Late Antiquity to the Carolingians. Leiden: BRILL. pp. 95–116.
- Shahîd, Irfan (1995). Byzantium and the Arabs in the Sixth Century. Vol. I. Washington: Dumbarton Oaks. ISBN 978-0-88402-214-5.
- Teall, J. L. (1965). "The Barbarians in Justinian's Armies". Speculum. 40 (2). Chicago: University of Chicago Press: 294–322. JSTOR 2855560.
- Treadgold, Warren (1995). Byzantium and Its Army, 284–1081. Stanford, CA: Stanford University Press. p. 284. ISBN 9780804731638.
- Vasiliev, Alexander A. (1936). The Goths in the Crimea. New York: Medieval Academy of America. p. 292.
- Whitby, Michael (2008). "The army, c. 420–602". The Cambridge Ancient History. Vol. XIV. pp. 288–314.
- Whitby, Michael (2021). The Wars of Justinian. Pen & Sword Military. p. 346. ISBN 978-1-52676-088-3.
- Wozniak, F. E. (1979). "Byzantine Diplomacy and the Lombard-Gepidic Wars". Balkan Studies. 20 (1): 139–158.
- Wozniak, F. E. (1981). "East Rome, Ravenna and Western Illyricum: 454–536 A.D.". Historia: Zeitschrift für Alte Geschichte. 30 (3). Stuttgart: Franz Steiner Verlag: 351–382. JSTOR 4435771.

==== In Russian ====
- Adontz, N. G. (1971). Армения в эпоху Юстиниана [Armenia in the Age of Justinian] (2nd ed.). Yerevan: Yerevan University Press. p. 526.
- Gadlo, A. V. (1979). Этническая история Северного Кавказа IV-X вв [Ethnic History of the North Caucasus, 4th–10th Centuries]. Leningrad: Leningrad State University Press. p. 87.
- Glushanin, E. P. (1986). "Пограничная армия Византии IV в." [The Frontier Army of Byzantium in the Fourth Century]. Vizantiysky Vremennik. 46. Moscow: Izdatel'stvo AN SSSR: 199–203. ISSN 0136-7358.
- Glushanin, E. P. (1991). Военная знать ранней Византии [The Military Nobility of Early Byzantium] (PDF). Barnaul: Altai Book Publishing House. p. 243.
- Diehl, Charles (1908). Юстиниан и Византийская цивилизация в VI веке [Justinian and Byzantine Civilization in the Sixth Century]. Saint Petersburg: Altshuler Printing House. p. 687.
- Diehl, Charles (1948). История Византийской империи [History of the Byzantine Empire]. Moscow: Foreign Literature Publishing House. p. 159.
- Luttwak, Edward (2010). Стратегия Византийской империи [The Grand Strategy of the Byzantine Empire]. Moscow: Dmitry Pozharsky University. p. 664. ISBN 978-5-91244-015-1.
- Ostrogorsky, George (2011). История Византийского государства [History of the Byzantine State]. Translated from German by M. V. Gratsiansky; edited by P. V. Kuzenkov. Moscow: Sibirskaya Blagozvonnitsa. p. 895. ISBN 978-5-91362-458-1.
- Pigulevskaya, N. V. (1964). Арабы у границ Византии и Ирана в IV—VI вв [The Arabs on the Borders of Byzantium and Iran in the 4th–6th Centuries]. Moscow–Leningrad: Nauka.
- Serov, V. V. (2000). "Персидские войны Юстиниана: финансовый аспект" [Justinian's Persian Wars: The Financial Aspect] (PDF). Vostokovednye issledovaniya na Altae: 29–44. Archived from the original (PDF) on 2012-07-26.
- Serov, V. V. (2008). "О времени формирования юстиниановской идеи реконкисты" [On the Timing of the Formation of Justinian's Idea of Reconquest] (PDF). Izvestiya Altayskogo gosudarstvennogo universiteta. 60 (4–3). Barnaul: Altai State University: 236–240. ISSN 1561-9443.
- Udaltsova, Z. V. (1953). "Политика византийского правительства в северной Африке при Юстиниане" [The Policy of the Byzantine Government in North Africa under Justinian]. Vizantiysky Vremennik. VI. Moscow: Izdatel'stvo AN SSSR: 88–112.
- Udaltsova, Z. V. (1959). Италия и Византия в VI веке [Italy and Byzantium in the Sixth Century]. Moscow: Izdatel'stvo AN SSSR. p. 542.
- Udaltsova, Z. V. (1967). "Внешняя политика Юстиниана. Попытки реставрации империи на Западе. Войны с Ираном. Византийская дипломатия" [Justinian's Foreign Policy. Attempts to Restore the Empire in the West. Wars with Iran. Byzantine Diplomacy]. In S. D. Skazkin (ed.). История Византии [History of Byzantium]. Vol. 1. pp. 298–337.
- Haldon, John (2007). История византийских войн [The Byzantine Wars]. Terra Historica. Moscow: Veche. p. 464. ISBN 978-5-9533-1952-2.
- Shuvalov, P. V. (2006). Секрет армии Юстиниана. Восточноримская армия в 491—641 гг [The Secret of Justinian's Army: The East Roman Army, 491–641]. Militaria Antiqua. Saint Petersburg: Petersburg Oriental Studies. p. 304. ISBN 5-85803-334-2.

==== In French ====
- Guilland, R. (1957). Recherches sur les institutions byzantines. Vol. I. Berlin: Akademie-Verlag. p. 607.
- Hannestad, K. (1961). "Les Forces militaires d'après la guerre gothique de Procope" (PDF). Classica et Mediaevalia. 21. Copenhagen: Museum Tusculanum Press: 136–183.
- Maspero, J. (1912). "Φοιδερᾶτοι et Στρατιῶται dans l'armée byzantine au VIe siècle". Byzantinische Zeitschrift. 21. Berlin: B. G. Teubner: 97–109.
