= 548 =

Calendar year

548 in various calendars
- Gregorian calendar: 548; DXLVIII
- Ab urbe condita: 1301
- Assyrian calendar: 5298
- Balinese saka calendar: 469–470
- Bengali calendar: −46 – −45
- Berber calendar: 1498
- Buddhist calendar: 1092
- Burmese calendar: −90
- Byzantine calendar: 6056–6057
- Chinese calendar: 丁卯年 (Fire Rabbit); 3245 or 3038 — to — 戊辰年 (Earth Dragon); 3246 or 3039
- Coptic calendar: 264–265
- Discordian calendar: 1714
- Ethiopian calendar: 540–541
- Hebrew calendar: 4308–4309
- Hindu calendars
- Vikram Samvat: 604–605
- Shaka Samvat: 469–470
- Kali Yuga: 3648–3649
- Holocene calendar: 10548
- Iranian calendar: 74 BP – 73 BP
- Islamic calendar: 76 BH – 75 BH
- Javanese calendar: 436–437
- Julian calendar: 548; DXLVIII
- Korean calendar: 2881
- Minguo calendar: 1364 before ROC 民前1364年
- Nanakshahi calendar: −920
- Seleucid era: 859/860 AG
- Thai solar calendar: 1090–1091
- Tibetan calendar: མེ་མོ་ཡོས་ལོ་ (female Fire-Hare); 674 or 293 or −479 — to — ས་ཕོ་འབྲུག་ལོ་ (male Earth-Dragon); 675 or 294 or −478

Year 548 (DXLVIII) was a leap year starting on Wednesday of the Julian calendar (as Gregorian calendar went into effect only in October 1582) and its dominical letters are ED. The denomination 548 for this year has been used since the early medieval period, when the Anno Domini calendar era became the prevalent method in Europe for naming years.

== Events ==
=== By place ===
==== Byzantine Empire ====
- June 28 – Empress Theodora I dies at age 48, probably of breast cancer (according to Bishop Victor of Tunnuna). Her body is buried in the Church of the Holy Apostles (Constantinople).
- Emperor Justinian I relieves Belisarius from military service, in favour of 70-year-old Byzantine general Narses.

==== Europe ====
- Theudigisel, Visigothic general, proclaims himself ruler over the Visigothic Kingdom, after King Theudis is assassinated.

==== Persia ====
- Lazic War: King Gubazes II revolts against the Persians, and requests aid from Justinian I. He sends a Byzantine expeditionary force (8,000 men) to Lazica (modern Georgia).
- Gubazes II besieges the fortress of Petra, located on the Black Sea. The Persian army under Mermeroes defeats a small Byzantine force guarding the mountain passes, and relieves Petra.
- Mermeroes stations a garrison of 3,000 men in the stronghold of Petra, and marches to Armenia. The Persians, lacking sufficient supplies, secure the supply routes and plunder Lazica.

==== Africa ====
- Spring – Battle of the Fields of Cato: The Byzantine army, under John Troglita, crushes the Moorish revolt in Byzacena (Tunisia).

==== Asia ====
- April 13 – Emperor Lý Nam Đế of Vietnam is killed by Laotian tribesmen, while on retreat from the Hong River Plain. He is succeeded by his elder brother Lý Thiên Bảo.

=== By topic ===
==== Commerce ====
- Cosmas Indicopleustes, Alexandrian merchant, writes his work Christian Topography. He describes the importance of the spice trade (especially in cloves and sweet aloes) in Ceylon, and the harvesting of pepper in India (approximate date).

==== Religion ====
- Saint Catherine's Monastery is established in the Sinai Peninsula.

== Births ==
- Xiao Zhuang, crown prince of the Southern Dynasties (approximate date)

== Deaths ==
- April 13 – Lý Nam Đế, emperor of Vietnam
- June 28 – Theodora I, Byzantine Empress
- Carcasan, king of the Ifuraces (Algeria)
- Chen Daoten, father of Xuan Di (or 549)
- Theudebert I, king of Austrasia (or 547)
- Theudis, king of the Visigoths
