= 549 =

Calendar year

549 in various calendars
- Gregorian calendar: 549; DXLIX
- Ab urbe condita: 1302
- Assyrian calendar: 5299
- Balinese saka calendar: 470–471
- Bengali calendar: −45 – −44
- Berber calendar: 1499
- Buddhist calendar: 1093
- Burmese calendar: −89
- Byzantine calendar: 6057–6058
- Chinese calendar: 戊辰年 (Earth Dragon); 3246 or 3039 — to — 己巳年 (Earth Snake); 3247 or 3040
- Coptic calendar: 265–266
- Discordian calendar: 1715
- Ethiopian calendar: 541–542
- Hebrew calendar: 4309–4310
- Hindu calendars
- Vikram Samvat: 605–606
- Shaka Samvat: 470–471
- Kali Yuga: 3649–3650
- Holocene calendar: 10549
- Iranian calendar: 73 BP – 72 BP
- Islamic calendar: 75 BH – 74 BH
- Javanese calendar: 437–438
- Julian calendar: 549; DXLIX
- Korean calendar: 2882
- Minguo calendar: 1363 before ROC 民前1363年
- Nanakshahi calendar: −919
- Seleucid era: 860/861 AG
- Thai solar calendar: 1091–1092
- Tibetan calendar: ས་ཕོ་འབྲུག་ལོ་ (male Earth-Dragon); 675 or 294 or −478 — to — ས་མོ་སྦྲུལ་ལོ་ (female Earth-Snake); 676 or 295 or −477

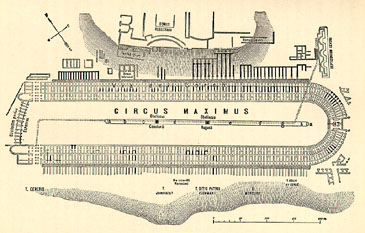
The Circus Maximus in Rome (1911)

Year 549 (DXLIX) was a common year starting on Friday of the Julian calendar. The denomination 549 for this year has been used since the early medieval period, when the Anno Domini calendar era became the prevalent method in Europe for naming years.

== Events ==
=== By place ===
==== Byzantine Empire ====
- Siege of Rome: The Ostrogoths under Totila besiege Rome for the third time, after Belisarius has returned to Constantinople. He offers a peace agreement, but this is rejected by Emperor Justinian I.
- Totila conquers the city of Perugia (Central Italy) and stations a Gothic garrison. He takes bishop Herculanus prisoner, and orders him to be completely flayed. The Ostrogoth soldier asked to perform this gruesome execution shows pity, and decapitates Herculanus before the skin on every part of his body is removed.
- In the Circus Maximus, first and largest circus in Rome, the last chariot races are held.

==== Europe ====
- January - Battle of Ciiil Conaire, Ireland: Ailill Inbanda and his brother are defeated and killed.
- Agila I succeeds Theudigisel as king of the Visigoths, after he is murdered by a group of conspirators during a banquet in Seville.

==== Persia ====
- Spring – Lazic War: The Byzantine army under Bessas combines forces with King Gubazes II, and defeats the Persians in Lazica (modern Georgia) in a surprise attack. The survivors retreat into Caucasian Iberia.
  - The Romans unsuccessfully besiege Petra, Lazica.

==== Asia ====
- Jianwen Di succeeds his father Wu Di as emperor of the Liang Dynasty (China).

=== By topic ===
==== Religion ====
- c. 549–564 – Transfiguration of Christ, mosaic in the apse, Church of the Virgin, Saint Catherine's Monastery in Egypt, is made.
- Fifth Council of Orléans: Nine archbishops and forty-one bishops pronounce an anathema against the errors of Nestorius and Eutyches.
- Bishop Maximianus of Ravenna consecrates the Basilica of Sant'Apollinare in Classe.
- The Roman Catholic Diocese of Ossory (which still exists) is founded in Ireland.

== Births ==
- Abū Lahab, uncle and staunch critic of Muhammad (d. 624)
- Jizang, Chinese Buddhist monk (d. 623)

== Deaths ==
- January – Ailill Inbanda, king of Connacht (Ireland) (killed in battle)
- February 16 – Zhu Yi, official of the Liang dynasty (b. 483)
- December 12 – Finnian of Clonard, Irish monastic saint (b. 470)
- exact date unknown
  - Ciarán of Clonmacnoise, Irish monastic saint
  - Gao Cheng, official and regent of Eastern Wei (b. 521)
  - Herculanus, bishop of Perugia
  - Theudigisel, king of the Visigoths (assassinated)
  - Túathal Máelgarb, king of Tara (Ireland)
  - Wu Di, emperor of the Liang dynasty (b. 464)
  - Xiao Zhengde, prince of the Liang dynasty
  - Xu Zhaopei, princess of the Liang dynasty
