= Siege of Sergiopolis =

Siege of Byzantine fortress by Khosrow I army

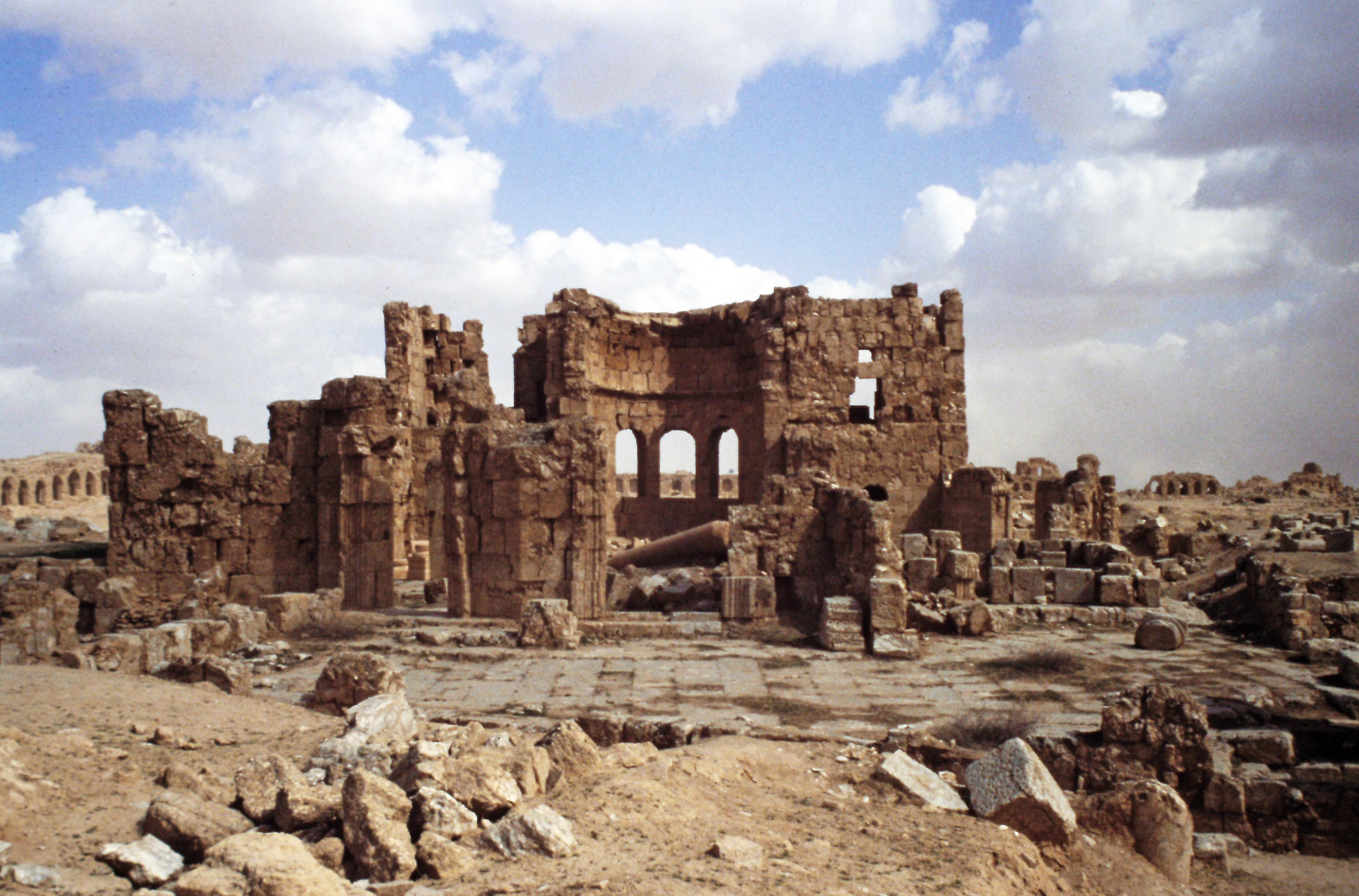
- Ruins of Sergiopolis
| Date | Spring 542 |
| Location | Sergiopolis, Byzantine Empire (now Resafa in Syria) |
| Result | Byzantine victory |

Belligerents
| Byzantine Empire | Sasanian Empire |

Commanders and leaders
| Unknown | Khosrow I |

Strength
| 200 | 6,000 |

The Siege of Sergipolis (Note: Ancient Greek: Πολιορκία της Σεργιόπολης) took place in 542 during the invasion of the Sasanian (Persian) king Khosrow I into the Syrian holdings of the Byzantine Empire during the Lazic War.

In an earlier invasion in 540, Khosrow had captured the Byzantine city of Sura, killing or enslaving its population. He then agreed to release the survivors for two centenaria of gold paid in the following year. The bishop of Sergiopolis, Candidus, failed to raise the required sum, prompting Khosrow to demand twice the amount during his subsequent invasion in 542. Instead, Candidus provided the treasures of the sanctuary of Saint Sergius. However, after receiving the treasures, Khosrow deemed them insufficient and used the search for additional wealth as a pretext to attack Sergiopolis. The city's defenders, aided by intelligence from a Christian Arab soldier in the Persian army, repelled the assaults. The Persian army was forced to withdraw because it was low on supplies. Khosrow subsequently advanced into Euphratesia to plan his raid on the Palestine region.

== Background ==
During his surprise invasion of the Byzantine Empire, Khosrow bypassed the fortified Byzantine cities of Circesium and Zenobia and instead besieged Sura after the magi predicted victory. The city's garrison under the Armenian commander, Arsaces, resisted the assaults until he was killed by an arrow, at which point the Persians pulled back to their camp for the night. Left leaderless, the Byzantines sent a priest to offer a ransom for their freedom the next day. Determined to make an example of Sura, Khosrow feigned agreement and sent envoys back with the priest, who placed objects between the gates to prevent them from closing. Once the gates opened, Khosrow ordered his army to storm the city, leading to killing, looting, and enslaving 12,000 survivors.

He released an envoy, called Anastasius, to report the devastation to Emperor Justinian I. In the meantime, he agreed to free the captives for two centenaria of gold (Note: This corresponds to 200 Roman pounds of gold.) within a year. The contemporary historian Procopius provides three possible reasons for this change: Khosrow's affection for a local woman, Euphemia, avarice, or humanity. (Note: Historian Ilkka Syvänne considers the first one as the more likely reason.) The bishop of Sergiopolis, Candidus, arranged the ransom, promising to repay the amount later or be removed from the priesthood. Khosrow accepted these terms and freed the inhabitants. Without financial backing from Justinian, Candidus failed to raise the gold. When Khosrow invaded again in 542, he arrested the bishop and demanded twice the amount of ransom. Candidus offered the treasures from the sanctuary of Saint Sergius, but after receiving the treasures, Khosrow deemed them insufficient and used the search for additional wealth as a pretext to attack the city of Sergiopolis.

== Siege ==
Khosrow tried to take the fortress by cunning, but a Christian Arab named Ambrus, who served in the Persian army, warned the garrison about the impending trap. After learning that the first plan had failed, the king of the Sassanians sent his entire army to storm the fortress, but the garrison withstood their charge, despite considering surrender. Ambrus again informed the Byzantines of important information: there was very little food in the Sassanian camp. The next day, the Persian troops, having failed to take the city, left.

== Aftermath ==
Khosrow advanced into the region of Euphratesia, planning to bypass strongholds near the borders and continue toward the wealthy region of Palestine and the treasures of Jerusalem. In response, Justinian dispatched general Belisarius to take command of the defenses and established his base at Europus on the Euphrates River. Belisarius summoned Bouzes and the other commanders who had taken refuge in Hierapolis. His presence west of the Euphrates River effectively prevented Khosrow from advancing further, and the Persian king withdrew.
