= Battle of Horreum Margi =

Battle between the Ostrogothic Kingdom and the Byzantine Empire (505 AD)

Date	505
Location	Near modern Ćuprija, Serbia
Result	Hunnic victory

Belligerents
Eastern Roman Empire	Ostrogothic Kingdom; Huns

Commanders and leaders
Sabinianus	Mundo; Pitzias

Strength
Unknown	2,500

Casualties and losses
Unknown	Unknown

The Battle of Horreum Margi was fought between the Ostrogothic Kingdom and the Eastern Roman Empire in 505.

== History ==
The battle took place as the Ostrogothic Kingdom was expanding into the Balkans, eventually encroaching upon Eastern Roman territory. In this endeavor they were led by the general Pitzias and had allied themselves with the Hunnic-Gepidic robber-chieftain Mundo. As a response, the Eastern Roman Empire sent Sabinianus with a large force of Bulgars. At Horreum Margi, modern-day Ćuprija, Serbia, Sabinuanus was defeated.

== Sources ==
- Jaques, Tony (2007). Dictionary of Battles and Sieges: F-O. Greenwood Publishing Group. ISBN 978-0313335389.
- Wolfram, Herwig (1990). History of the Goths. University of California Press. ISBN 0520069838.
