= Chilbudius =

Byzantine general

- Died: c. 533; Wallachian Plain
- Military career
- Allegiance: Byzantine Empire
- Rank: magister militum

Chilbudius or Chilbuldius (Greek: Χιλβούδιος, Khilboudios) was a Byzantine general, holding the rank of magister militum per Thracias in the early 530s. He was apparently killed in battle c. 533, but an impostor claimed his identity c. 545–546. The only source for both men is Procopius.

== Origin ==
According to some scholars Chilbudius was probably a Slav, although Florin Curta argues this view was misled by the story of the Antian namesake who claimed his identity.

The name has also been considered to be of Germanic origin. Bohdan Strumins'kyj suggested a Gothic name, *Hil(i)baudeis / *Hil(i)būdeis, a name attested in Old High German as Hillibodo, rather than the traditional Slavic etymology of *xvalibud ("awakener of glory"). This demonstrates the difficulty in etymologizing proper names.

== Biography ==
Chilbudius served as a member of the household of emperor Justinian I (r. 527–565). Procopius introduces him as a vigorous soldier and commends him for his lack of avarice. He claims that Chilbudius was not seeking to amass wealth for himself.

Chilbudius was appointed magister militum per Thracias "in the fourth year" of Justinian' reign (530/531). He was the direct successor of Germanus in that post. He was tasked with defending the Danube limes against barbarian incursions. He served for three years (c. 533/534), eventually moving his forces to the north of the Danube. In this manner, Chilbudius prevented invasions in Byzantine territories while taking the battle to hostile territory. He was reportedly killed in battle with Slavs (South Slavs) at the end of this period.

In 545/546, one of the Antae, held captive by the Sclaveni, claimed to be Chilbudius. With the Antae and the Sclaveni temporarily at peace with each other, the Chilbudius impostor passed to the hands of another member of the Antae. A Byzantine captive held by the same man persuaded their master that his fellow slave was the real Chilbudius. He also tried to convince said master to return the captive to Justinian, which would require a journey through Byzantine areas. When among the other Antae, the impostor revealed his actual identity and tried to claim the status of a freedman. His tribesmen found him more useful as Chilbudius than as one of them. He was pressured to continue the pretense.

At about this time, Justinian started negotiations with the Antae. He offered to them the ancient city of Turris, "to the north of the river Ister" (the Danube), and its vicinity. The city had been reportedly built by Trajan (r. 98–117) but lay deserted at the time. The Antae would be allowed to settle in this area and receive payment for guarding the Byzantine borders against the Huns, effectively gaining foederati status. The Antae accepted, but on the condition that "Chilbudius" would be restored to office, attempting to raise their man to the rank of magister militum. The plot was reportedly unveiled by Narses, who captured the Chilbudius impostor and transported him to Constantinople. His subsequent fate is unknown. Whatever his real identity, the impostor reportedly spoke Latin fluently.

== Interpretation ==
The relevant narrative of Procopius has been compared to the typical plots of the Ancient Greek comedy (New Comedy in particular) and/or Plautus. Florin Curta argues that Procopius' tale should not be taken at face value. The story probably has a historic basis, but Procopius "surely reworked the account and arranged it according to comic narrative patterns".

Curta suggests that the Antae might have understood "Chilbudius" as a title, rather than a name, and thus named a Chilbudius of their own. The activities of Narses do not seem to have disrupted the alliance. A number of Antae seem to have joined the Byzantines in the ongoing Gothic War (535-554), and are recorded fighting against the Ostrogoths in Lucania.

== Sources ==
- Amory, Patrick (2003). People and Identity in Ostrogothic Italy, 489-554. Cambridge University Press. ISBN 978-0-521-52635-7.
- Cameron, Averil (2000). Averil Cameron, Bryan Ward-Perkins and Michael Whitby (ed.). Late Antiquity: Empire and Successors, A.D. 425–600. Cambridge University Press. ISBN 0-521-32591-9.
- Curta, Florin (2001). The Making of the Slavs: History and Archaeology of the Lower Danube Region, c. 500–700. Cambridge: Cambridge University Press. ISBN 9781139428880.
- Martindale, John R.; Jones, A.H.M.; Morris, John (1992), The Prosopography of the Later Roman Empire - Volume III, AD 527–641, Cambridge University Press, ISBN 0-521-20160-8
- Strumins'kyj, Bohdan (1979–1980). "Were the Antes Eastern Slavs?". Harvard Ukrainian Studies. 3–4: 786–796.
