= Sura, Syria =

Sura
- Location within Syria
- 35°53′56.0″N 38°46′47.2″E
- Location: Syria
- Region: Raqqa Governorate

Sura (Suriya), was an ancient city on the Euphrates River in northern Syria, today on a site 25 km west of Raqqa and 35 km north of Resafa. In the Roman Empire, Sura was a fortress city in the Roman province of Syria, and later on, in the Euphratensis.

In the 3rd century, Sura was a marginal attachment to the Strata Diocletiana to protect it against the Parthians. According to the Notitia dignitatum, Sura was the seat of the Prefect of the Legio XVI Flavia Firma. The legionary camp was located in the city and the city wall (1700 × 450 meters) was renewed under Justinian.

== History ==
It was a [Byzantine] garrison of some importance in the Persian campaigns of Belisarius; and a full account is given of the circumstances under which it was taken and burned by Chosroes I. (A.D. 532), who, having marched three long days' journey from Circesium to Zenobia, along the course of the Euphrates, thence proceeded an equal distance up the river to Sura. Incidental mention of the bishop proves that it was then an episcopal see. (Procop. Bell. Pers. i. 18, ii. 5.) Its walls were so weak that it did not hold out more than half an hour; but it was afterwards more substantially fortified, by order of the emperor Justinian. (Id. de Aedificiis Justiniani, ii. 9.)"

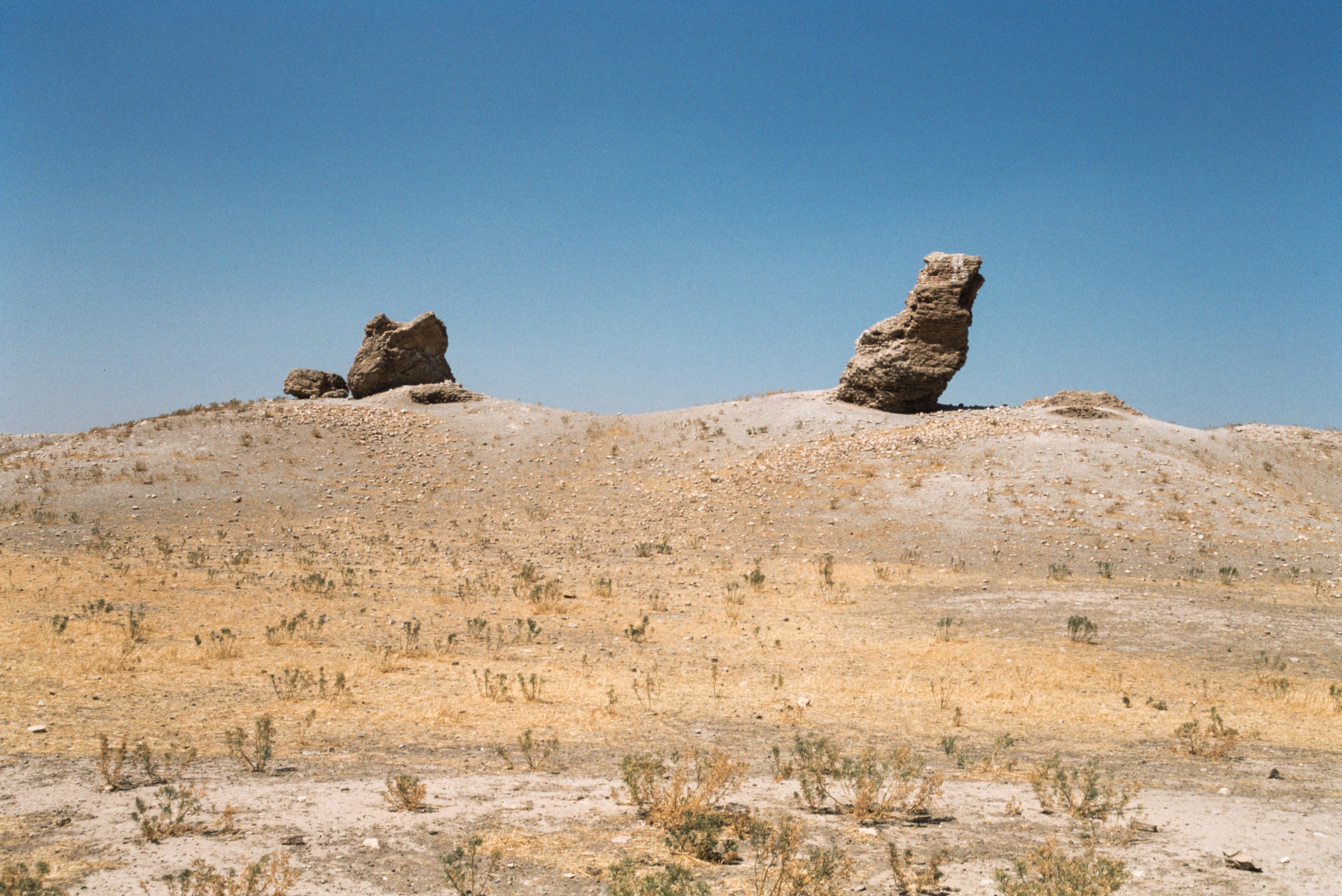
Remains of the fortress at Sura. Photo by Frank Kidner

== Bishopric ==
Sura became a Christian bishopric, a suffragan of the metropolitan see of Hierapolis Euphratensis, the capital of the Roman province of Syria Euphratensis, as witnessed by a 6th-century Notitia Episcopatuum. At the Council of Chalcedon in 451, metropolitan bishop Stephanus signed the acts also on behalf of Bishop Uranius of Sura. Bishop Marius of Sura was deposed in 518 for joining the Jacobites.

No longer a residential bishopric, Sura is now listed by the Catholic Church as a titular see.

== Bibliography ==
- Nigel Pollard: Soldiers, Cities, & Civilians in Roman Syria. University of Michigan Press, Ann Arbor 2000, ISBN 0-472-11155-8. S. 295–296.
- Michaela Konrad: Der spätrömische Limes in Syrien. Archäologische Untersuchungen an den Grenzkastellen von Sura, Tetrapyrgium, Cholle und in Resafa. Resafa 5. Zabern, Mainz 2001.
