= Agila I =

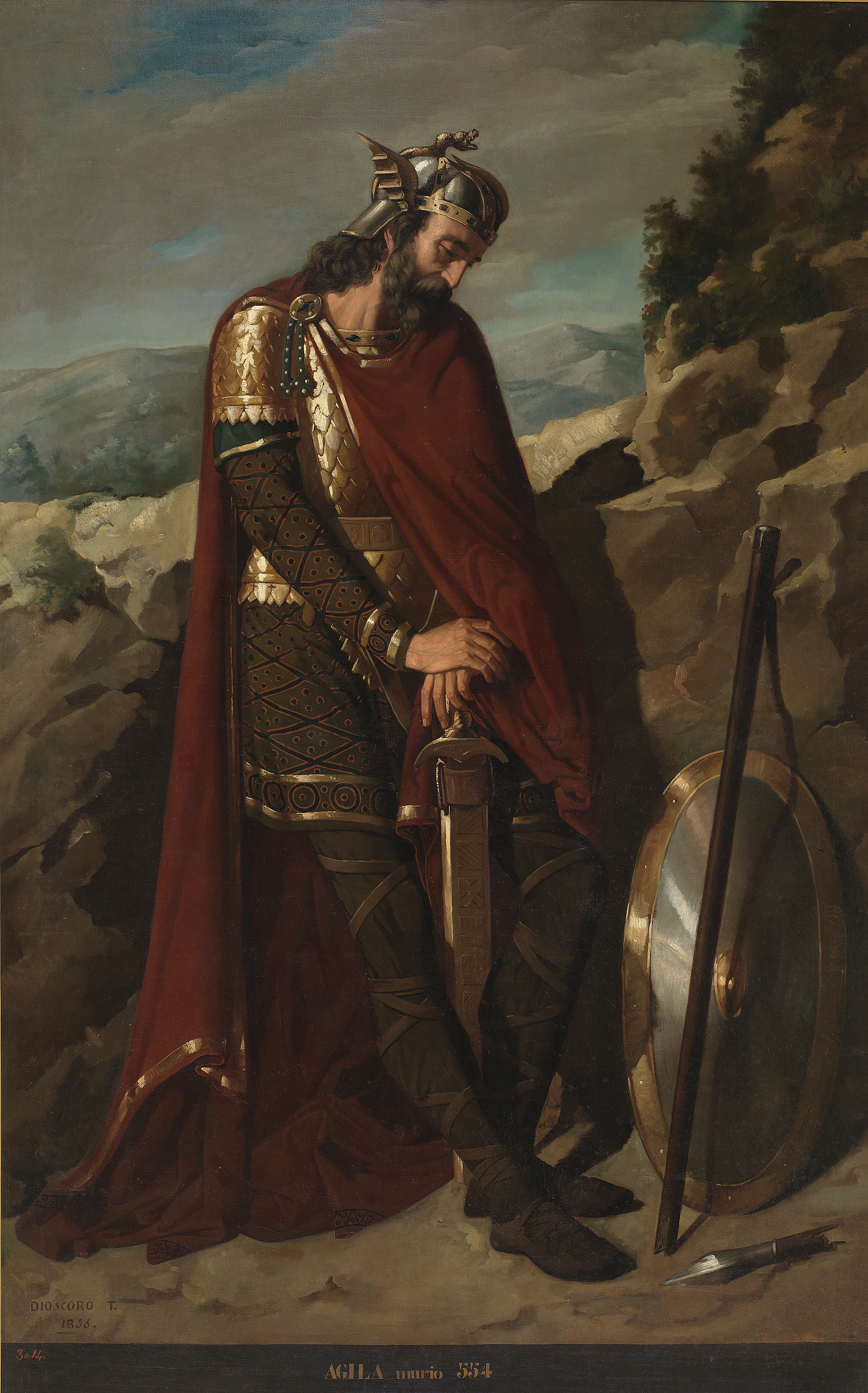
- Posthumous portrait of Agila I painted in 1853

King of the Visigoths
- Reign: c. December 549 – March 554
- Predecessor: Theudigisel
- Successor: Athanagild
- Died: March 554
- Religion: Arianism

Agila, sometimes Agila I or Achila I (Note: His name may also be spelled Akhila or Aquila. In Spanish it may be rendered Ágila.) (died March 554), was Visigothic king of Hispania and Septimania (549 – March 554). Peter Heather notes that Agila's reign was during a period of civil war following the death of Amalaric, the last member of the old Visigothic dynasty, when ambitious Gothic nobles competed openly for the throne.

Agila came to power after the assassination of Theudigisel, who had ruled for less than two years. However, opposition to his rule soon emerged. First was the revolt of the city of Corduba, which Isidore of Seville suggests was due to local Roman Catholics objecting to his Arianism: in his account, Isidore mentions that Agila defiled the church of a local saint, Acisclus, by drenching the sepulcher "with the blood of the enemy and of their pack-animals", and attributes the death of Agila's son in the conflict — along with the majority of his army, and the royal treasury — to "the agency of the saints".

Peter Heather lists several groups who revolted against Agila: a local dynast, Aspidius, established a hegemony in one mountainous region; the landowners of Cantabria established a "senate" to govern their affairs; and then there are the Sappi and Suani mentioned by John of Biclar.

The most important rebel opposed to Agila was Athanagild, whose open revolt began in 551, following Agila's defeat at Cordoba. The armies of Agila and Athanagild met at Seville, where Agila met a second defeat. At this point, a third party entered the war between these two: the Byzantine Empire. As Peter Heather writes, "One of the two — which is the subject of varying report — summoned a Byzantine army, which duly arrived in southern Spain in 552." Heather understands Isidore's chronicle states that Athanagild summoned the Byzantines, while Jordanes implies in his Getica that Agila had asked them for help.

During this three-sided conflict King Agila was killed — according to Isidore by his own people, who realized the destruction Agila's wars to retain power had caused, but "fearing even more that Roman soldiers might invade Spain on the pretext of giving help". Athanagild was then accepted as king.

== Sources ==
Regnal titles
| Preceded by Theudigisel | King of the Visigoths; December 549 – March 554 | Succeeded by Athanagild |
