= Theudis =

King of the Visigoths

King of the Visigoths
- Reign: 531 – c. June 548
- Predecessor: Amalaric
- Successor: Theudigisel
- Born: c. 480
- Died: c. June 548 (68 years)
- Religion: Arianism

Theudis (Note: Roger Collins notes that in the preambles of two church councils held in 546, he was referred to as "Theodoric," although Isidore of Seville calls him Theudis.) (Spanish: Teudis, Portuguese: Têudis), (c. 480 – June 548) was king of the Visigoths in Hispania from 531 to 548.

== Biography ==
An Ostrogoth, he was the sword-bearer of Theodoric the Great, who sent him to govern the Visigothic kingdom during the minority of Amalaric, the son of king Alaric II and Theodegotha, the daughter of king Theodoric.

According to Procopius, during his governorship Theudis had married a Spanish woman who "belonged to the house of one of the wealthy inhabitants of that land, and not only possessed great wealth but also a great estate in Spain." With this wealth he was able to muster a private army of two thousand men, effectively making him independent of Theodoric's authority. Theodoric did not take any action against Theudis. One reason was that doing so would give the Franks, who had killed the Visigothic king Alaric in the Battle of Vouillé, an excuse to take to the field once again. Another was that Theudis was careful to obey the commands of his king, and never failed to send the annual tribute. (Note: Procopius, De bello Gothico I (V).12.50-54. Translated in H.B. Dewing, Procopius (London: Heinemann, 1968), vol. 3 pp. 131 - 131.)

Following the assassination of Amalaric, last of the Balti dynasty, Theudis was elected king. Renown historian Herwig Wolfram believes one factor that led to his selection was support of fellow Ostrogoths who had gone west with him. Whereas historian Peter Heather posits a second, noting that two of Theudis' Italian relatives—Ildibad and Totila—became kings of the Ostrogoths following the fall of the House of Theodoric in the Gothic Wars, adding that they likely represented "a particularly powerful non-royal clan."

In 541, Theudis had to confront the Franks under Chlothar I and Childebert I, who had penetrated as far as Zaragoza, which they besieged for forty-nine days, but according to Gregory of Tours the Franks lifted their siege when they learned the city was protected by the relics of Saint Vincent of Saragossa. The primary sources disagree over the outcome of this Frankish invasion; for instance, Isidore of Seville writes that the future king Theudigisel, who was then a general of Theudis, had killed all of the invaders except a group which had bribed him to allow them to escape; while Gregory of Tours posits that "they succeeded in conquering a large part of Spain and they returned to Gaul with immense booty." Historian Roger Collins observes that this was the first Visigothic victory over their Frankish rivals—an achievement which undoubtedly added to Theudis' prestige.

Early in his reign, Theudis (533) received a delegation from the Vandal king Gelimer seeking help against the impending Byzantine assault. Theudis received them cordially, throwing a banquet in their honor, at which he asked them how matters were in Carthage. The envoys had traveled slowly to Hispania, and were out of contact with events in Africa; meanwhile a merchant ship, which had left Carthage the same day it fell to the Byzantines, encountered favorable winds and reached Hispania first with the news, which Theudis had known when the Vandal envoys arrived. So when they proposed an alliance against the Byzantines, Theudis declined. Instead, he told them to go to the sea-coast, "For from there you will learn of the affairs in Africa with certainty." Puzzled at this response, the envoys eventually followed his advice and returned to Carthage where they were taken prisoner by the victorious Byzantines. (Note: Procopius, De bello Vandalico I (III).24.7-18; translated by Dewing, vol. 2 pp. 197f.) Roger Collins suggests that Theudis exploited the Vandals' defeat by occupying a portion of North Africa opposite Spain. This would explain why in 542 the Visigoths made an unsuccessful attempt to come to the defense of Ceuta, when the Byzantines besieged it from land and sea. According to Isidore of Seville, the invading army refused to fight on the Sabbath, and when the Byzantines learned of this attacked the Visigoths and left not one alive.

Despite Theudis being an Arian Christian, Isidore of Seville praises him, for he not only tolerated the practices of the native Roman Catholic citizens, but permitted their bishops to meet at Toledo to arrange "those matters which were necessary for the teaching of the Church." (Note: However, in a footnote to his translation of Isidore's Historia, historian Kenneth Baxter Wolf identifies this meeting with the Second Council of Toledo, implying that Isidore misdated this Council. See: Conquerors and Chroniclers of Early Medieval Spain, second edition (Liverpool: Liverpool University Press, 1999), p. 98 n. 106.) Collins notes that "of the few provincial councils that are known to have taken place in Spain before 589, nearly half were held during his (Theudis) reign: I Barcelonia in 540, Lerida in 546 and Valencia also in 546." During his reign a further codification of Gothic law was effected and promulgated in November 546, which quoted numerous Roman authorities and was also intended to scale payments made to the iudices for rendering justice.

In 548, he was assassinated in his palace by a man who had feigned madness in order to get close enough to strike the fatal blow. According to Isidore of Seville, as he bled out Theudis called out that no one kill his murderer, "saying that he had received a requital agreeing with his own deserts, because he himself too as a private citizen had killed his leader." Motivation for this murder may very well have been a "blood feud" according to historian Herwig Wolfram, who notes that of some forty kings and anti-kings beginning with Alaric I, not even half of them died a natural death. (Note: Wolfram writes, "The morbus Gothicus, the 'Gothic disease', was raging: as if in a fit of madness the Goths eliminated kings by deposition or murder.)

== Bibliography ==
- Burns, Thomas (1991). A History of the Ostrogoths. Bloomington; Indianapolis: Indiana University Press. ISBN 978-0-25320-600-8.
- Collins, Roger (1995). Early Medieval Spain: Unity in Diversity, 400–1000. London: Macmillan. ISBN 978-1-34924-135-4.
- Gregory of Tours (1974). The History of the Franks. Translated by Lewis Thorpe. New York: Penguin Books. ISBN 978-0-14044-295-3.
- Heather, Peter (1998). The Goths. Oxford: Blackwell. ISBN 978-0-63120-932-4.
- Isidore of Seville (1970). Isidore of Sevilleʼs History of the Goths, Vandals, and Suevi. Translated by Guido Donini and Gordon B. Ford. Leiden: Brill Publishing. OCLC 875361806.
- Wolfram, Herwig (1988). History of the Goths. Berkeley and Los Angeles: University of California Press. ISBN 0-520-05259-5.
- Wolfram, Herwig (1997). The Roman Empire and its Germanic Peoples. Berkeley and Los Angeles: University of California Press. ISBN 0-520-08511-6.
- Wood, Ian (1994). The Merovingian Kingdoms, 450–751. London and New York: Longman. ISBN 0-582-49372-2.

Regnal titles
Preceded by Amalaric	King of the Visigoths; 531–548	Succeeded by Theudigisel
