= Theudigisel =

King of the Visigoths
- Reign: c. June 548 – c. December 549
- Predecessor: Theudis
- Successor: Agila I
- Born: c. 500
- Died: c. December 549 (aged 49)
- Dynasty: Amali
- Father: Theodahad
- Religion: Arianism

Theudigisel (or Theudegisel) (in Latin Theudigisclus and in Spanish, Galician and Portuguese Teudiselo, Teudigiselo, or Teudisclo), (c. 500 – December 549) was king of the Visigoths in Hispania and Septimania (548–549). Some Visigothic king lists skip Theudigisel, as well as Agila I, going directly from Theudis to Athanagild.

== Biography ==
Theudigisel was a leading Ostrogoth general during the reign of Theudis (531–548), and was attested as the last member of the House of Theodoric, being the son of Theodahad (535–536) & grandnephew of Theodoric the Great. He had repelled the Franks from Spain after their invasion of 541, cutting them off in the pass of Valcarlos, but accepted a bribe to allow them to return to home. Years later, when Theudis was murdered by a disgruntled servant, Theudigisel had managed to make himself King of Visigoths shortly after his predecessor's death. He ruled from June 548 – December 549.

According to Isidore of Seville, Theudigisel was assassinated because he "defiled the marriages of very many powerful men by public prostitution", and was assassinated by a group of conspirators during a banquet in Seville. Although he agrees that Theudigisel died during a banquet, Gregory of Tours records a different tale of his end: in the middle of the feast, the lights were blown out and an unidentified person killed Theudigisel in the dark. "The Goths had adopted the reprehensible habit of killing out of hand any king who displeased them and replacing him on the throne by someone they preferred," Gregory concludes.

Regnal titles
| Preceded by Theudis | King of the Visigoths; 548–549 | Succeeded by Agila I |
