= Siege of Martyropolis (531) =

531 siege

- Part of the Iberian War
- Byzantine-Persian frontier in the 4th to 7th centuries
Date	July – November 531 AD
Location	Martyropolis, Byzantine Empire (modern-day Silvan, Şanlıurfa, Turkey) 38°08′37″N 41°00′36″E
Result	Byzantine victory

Belligerents
Sasanian Empire; Huns	Byzantine Empire; Ghassanids

Commanders and leaders
Chanaranges; Bawi Mermeroes	Bouzes; Bessas
- Location within Turkey

Between July and November 531 AD, the Byzantine city of Martyropolis was besieged by an invading Sasanian army during the Iberian War.

The Iberian War stemmed from competition between the Byzantines and Persians for control of the Kingdom of Iberia in the Caucasus region. The war began when the Kingdom of Iberia sought the protection of the Byzantine Empire. Both Byzantine and Persian sides suffered from setbacks during the war. The Byzantine emperor Justinian I focused on strengthening the eastern frontier cities while attempting to negotiate with the Persians. The Persian king Kavadh I sought to gain an advantage by launching invading forces upon Byzantine territories. The city of Martyropolis was strategically located near the Persian border and the Byzantine commander Bessas used it as his base to launch raids into the Persian territory. In response, Kavadh sent an army to besiege Martyropolis. The Persians used siege machines and ladders to assault the city. The defenders, though at a disadvantage because of limited supplies, resisted the assaults.

The Persians became concerned upon hearing that their expected Sabir Hun allies had changed sides due to a Byzantine deception. At the same time, they learned that a Byzantine relief force was approaching the city. The siege was disrupted by Kavadh's death in September 531. His successor, Khosrow I, sought peace to secure his claim to the throne, prompting the Persian army to lift the siege and withdraw to their territory. In 532, Justinian and Khosrow signed the Perpetual Peace, ending the Iberian War.

== Background ==
The Iberian War was a conflict between the Byzantine Empire under Justinian I and the Sasanian Empire under Kavadh I, driven to take control of the Kingdom of Iberia near the Caucasus. The war began after the Iberian king rebelled against Persian rule and sought Byzantine support. Fighting took place across regions of Armenia and Mesopotamia. Although the Persians initially held the advantage, back-to-back Byzantine victories at Dara and Satala shifted the momentum and restored balance to the war. To press for an advantage, Kavadh ordered a campaign to target the city of Antioch. A Byzantine army blocked the Persian army from advancing to Antioch, but as the Persians were returning to Persian territory, the two armies engaged near the city of Callinicum. Although the Persians were victorious, it was a Pyrrhic victory because no fortress was captured and casualties were high.

At the time, Justinian bolstered the Byzantine position and sought a truce with the Persians. Justinian appointed Sittas as strategos (general) in charge of the east. He also appointed Bessas as duke (dux) of the province of Mesopotamia, with the frontier city of Martyropolis, which had recently been fortified by Justinian, as his base. Initially, Bessas repelled a Persian invasion, but then in a subsequent encounter, the leader of the Persian forces, Gader, fell in battle and the nephew of the governor of Arzanene was captured. Bessas then raided the Persian holdings in Arzanene. The Persian king recognized the strategic importance of Martyropolis, which could provide refuge for the Byzantine army while also serving as a base for launching raids due to its proximity to Persian territories. Kavadh launched another invasion with a Persian army under Adergoudounbades, Bawi, and Mermeroes to besiege Martyropolis in July 531.

== Siege ==
The Byzantine garrison was commanded by Bessas and Bouzes. Sittas and his Ghassanid ally Al-Harith ibn Jabalah were stationed near the city, but avoided engagement because the Persians had the upper hand in the conflict. The defenders were at a disadvantage because the city's recently built walls were incomplete and supplies were limited. The Persians attempted to breach the city with various approaches. They used mines to undermine the city walls, ladders to breach the city, an onager (stone thrower), and a siege tower. However, the Byzantines resisted the Persian attacks and devised countermeasures, one of which was to build a tower taller than the Persian siege tower inside the walls, equipped to drop heavy stones onto the Persian machinery.

Meanwhile, a Byzantine relief army was assembled under Sittas and Hermogenes. At this point, a Persian spy defected, revealing to the Byzantines the planned arrival of the Sabir Huns as Persian allies. Justinian sent him back to the Persians to spread the false claim that the Huns would support the Byzantines instead. The Persians became concerned upon the news of a possible deception by the Huns and that a Byzantine army was approaching. The state of the siege changed when Kavadh suffered paralysis on 8 September 531 and named his son Khosrow I as his successor. Kavadh died five days later. Although his eldest son Kawus claimed the throne, the Persian magnates confirmed Khosrow, supported by Kavadh's written declaration. Khosrow sought peace with Justinian to secure his claim to the throne. As a result, the Persian army lifted the siege and withdrew in November 531, after which the Byzantine relief army reached the city of Amida a short time later.

== Aftermath ==
Soon after the end of the siege, the Sabir Huns invaded Byzantine regions near Antioch. However, their campaign was not successful because the Byzantines had advance warning and protected much of the population and its property inside fortified cities, leaving little for the raiders to seize. The Byzantine forces used fortifications, ambushes, and harassment to wear down the Huns before defeating them as they withdrew. In the spring of 532, Justinian and Khosrow signed a peace treaty, the Perpetual Peace, ending the Iberian War.

== Sources ==
- Greatrex, Geoffrey [in German]; Lieu, Samuel N. C. (2002). The Roman Eastern Frontier and the Persian Wars (Part II, 363–630 AD). London: Routledge. ISBN 0-415-14687-9.
- Greatrex, Geoffrey (1998). Rome and Persia at War, 502–532. Cambridge: Francis Cairns. ISBN 0-905205-93-6.
- Heather, Peter J. (2018). Rome Resurgent: War and Empire in the Age of Justinian. New York, NY: Oxford University Press. ISBN 978-0-199-36274-5. OCLC 1007044617.
- Syvänne, Ilkka (2021). Military History of Late Rome 518–565. Yorkshire, PA: Pen and Sword Military. ISBN 978-1-47-389530-0. OCLC 1251765729.
