= Rufinus (Byzantine official) =

Roman official born in the 5th century

- Born: 5th century
- Occupations: General and emissary
- Years active: 5th and 6th centuries
- Known for: Capture of two of Vitalian's guards; Embassies to the court of Kavad I and Khosrow I; Investigation of the Huns Sabir people attack
- Office: Magister militum; Patrician (ancient Rome)
- Spouse: Daughter of John the Scythian
- Children: John

Rufinus (Greek: Ῥουφῖνος) was a Byzantine military officer and emissary of the 6th century, active during the reigns of emperors Anastasius I Dicorus (r. 491–518), Justin I (r. 518–527), and Justinian I (r. 527–565). Of Greek origin, he was the son and brother, respectively, of the officers Silvanus and Timostratus. He first appeared in 502, when he was sent by Anastasius to the court of the Sasanian shah Kavad I (r. 488–496; 499–531) with large amounts of money to prevent attacks on the Byzantine Empire. When Rufinus learned of the Persian attacks, he left the money in Caesarea and met in Amida Kavad I, who imprisoned him until January 503, when he was released and sent to the emperor.

Rufinus reappears in 515, when he was appointed magister militum of Thrace by Anastasius to replace the rebel Vitalian, and then in 525/6 when the magister militum of the East and future emperor Justinian sent him to the court of Kavad I to discuss the terms of Justinian's adoption of Khosrow I (r. 531–578). In 530, Rufinus was sent by Justinian to negotiate peace with the Persians, but remained in Dara until after the battle in its vicinity in July 531, when he left to negotiate the terms. Upon Kavad's death in September, Rufinus was sent with other emissaries to discuss terms with the newly installed Khosrow, while in October he was charged with the investigation of an invasion of Huns-Sabirs. Upon completion of the investigations, he sent General Dorotheus to deal with the situation.

After the Sabir incident, Justinian refused to accept some of the terms of the negotiated agreements, and Khosrow became annoyed with such refusal. This forced Rufinus to intervene and try to establish new terms, convincing Khosrow to return the money previously offered and withdraw his troops from Byzantine territory. In 532, Rufinus is mentioned one last time, for having concluded the famous Perpetual Peace that ended the war.

== Life ==
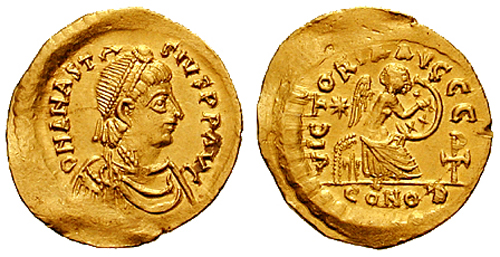
Semissis of Anastasius I Dicoro (r. 491–518)

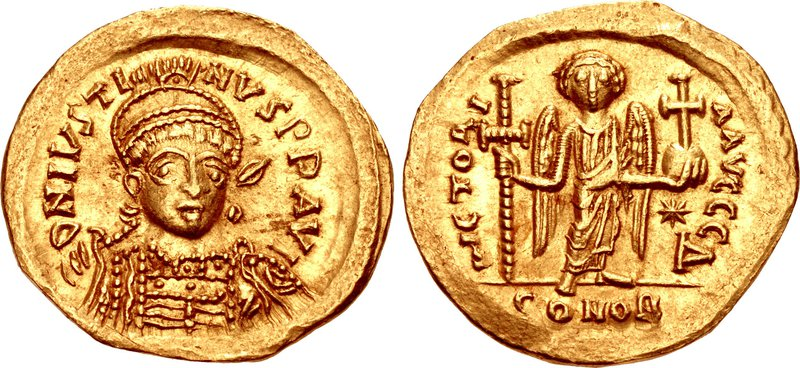
Solidus of Justin I (r. 518–527)

Rufinus was born on an unknown date during the fifth century. Of Greek origin, he was the son and brother, respectively, of the officers Silvanus and Timostratus. According to Theophanes the Confessor, he married the daughter of John the Scythian and fathered the consul John, although the dates of his marriage or the birth of his son are unknown. Rufinus first appears in late 502, amid the Anastasian War, when he was sent by the emperor Anastasius I Dicorus (r. 491–518) to the court of the Sasanian shah Kavad I (r. 488–496; 499–531) to deliver a large amount of money so that the Persians would not carry out attacks against the Byzantine Empire. Upon learning that attacks had already begun, Rufinus kept the money in Caesarea and set out to meet Kavad at Amida to ask him to withdraw his troops and accept the tribute. Rufinus was captured and kept under guard until the capture and looting of Diyarbakir in January 503, when the Persians released him and sent him to inform the emperor.

Rufinus reappears in sources in 515 when he was appointed by Anastasius as magister militum of Thrace to replace the rebel Vitalian; Marcellinus Comes states the appointment happened in 516. During this period, Rufinus captured two of Vitalian's bodyguards and, together with Alathar, was treated with scorn by Vitalian. Rufinus again disappears from the sources, being cited only in 525/6, during the reign of Emperor Justin I (r. 518–527), when the magister militum of the East and future emperor Justin I (r. 527–565) sent him, alongside Hypatius, to the court of Kavad I to discuss terms to Justin's adoption of Khosrow I (r. 531–578), son of Kavad. With the failure of negotiations with the Persian emissaries Mebodes and Siyawush, Rufinus made faulty accusations against Hypatius. During the time he was in Persia, he convinced Kavad to appoint Khosrow as his successor and advised the queen to seek medical help from a monk named Moses, who lived in Dara.

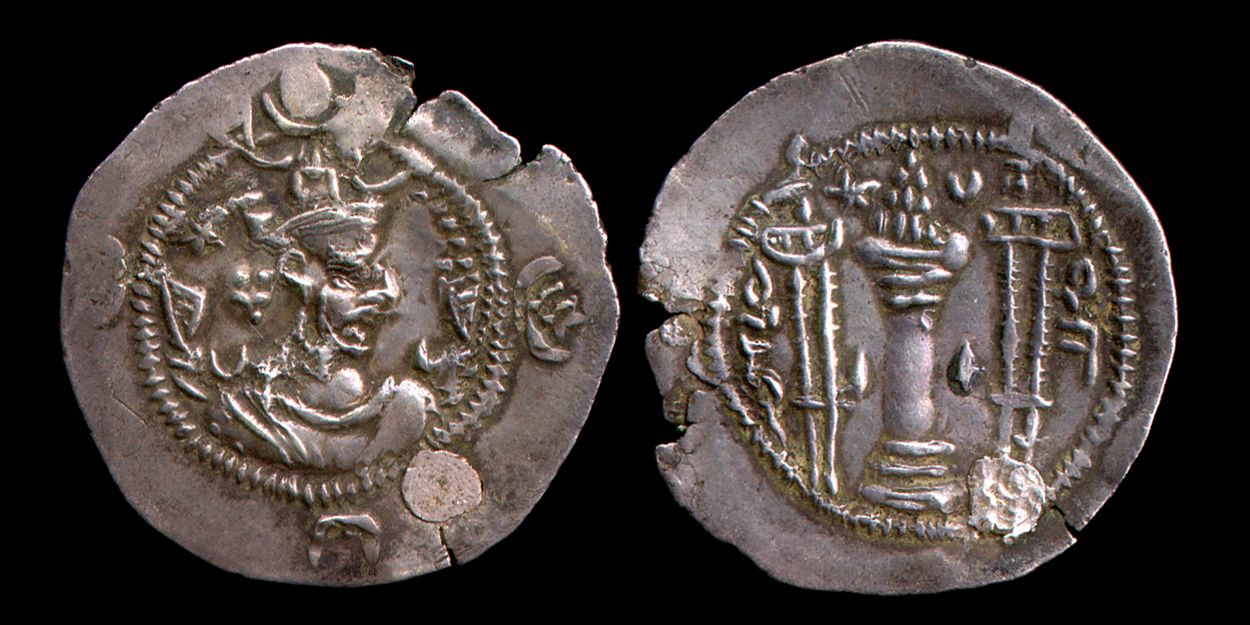
Drachm of Kavad I (r. 488–496; 499–531)

By 530, the sources mention that Rufinus still held the position of magister militum, although they do not specify from which region. They also mention he was a patrician, and it is possible that he had already held this honorific position since 525/6. In that year, in the context of the Iberian War, the then-emperor Justinian sent him along with Hermogenes as ambassador to Kavad I, although the latter instructed the two not to go beyond Hierapolis before receiving further instructions. According to John Malalas, the Persians had prevented them from proceeding beyond Dara. Rufinus is mentioned in a letter from General Belisarius addressed to the Persian commander shortly before the Battle of Dara as an imperial emissary stationed nearby ready to begin negotiations. With the end of the battle in June, Rufinus departed with Alexander to the Persian court, where they arrived in August. According to Procopius, Rufinus is said to have delivered the following speech before the shah:

Rufinus, entering the presence of Kavad I, spoke as follows: 'O king, I have been sent by your brother [Justinian], who scolds you only with reproach, because the Persians without just cause have come in arms in your land. But it would be more convenient for a king who is not only powerful but also wise like you to secure a peaceful conclusion to the war, rather than, when matters have been satisfactorily settled, to inflict upon yourself and your people unnecessary confusion. That is why I too have come here myself with good hopes, so that now both peoples may enjoy the blessings that come from peace.'

Byzantine emissaries returned to Justinian in September 530 with terms acceptable to Kavad. The emperor was ready to accept them, but when Rufinus returned to the court of Kavad I, the latter had been informed of the Byzantines' difficulties in dealing with the revolt of the Samaritans, which made him decline peace. The emissary returned to Constantinople with the news. In 531, after the Battle of Callinicum on April 19, Rufinus and Strategius were sent to the Persians seeking peace but were prevented in Edessa since the shah had sent his armies to Byzantine territory. It is likely that Rufinus was among the ambassadors who were prevented by Justinian from crossing into Persia after the death of Kavad I (in September of that year), before Sassanid emissaries arrived to inform them officially about the rise of Khosrow I. Once the emperor received the news, Rufinus, Hermogenes, Alexander, and Thomas (according to Procopius), or Rufinus and Strategius (according to Malalas) were sent to negotiate with Khosrow.

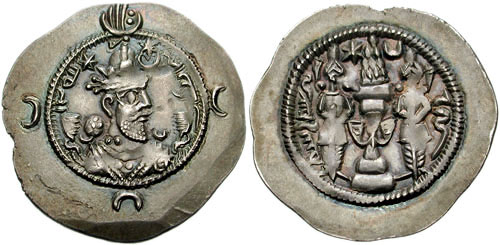
Drachm of Khosrow I (r. 531–579)

Roman-Persian border between the 4th and 6th centuries

A 70-day truce (three months according to John Malalas) was established while Rufinus went to Constantinople to have Justinian consider the agreed terms. During his absence, rumors that Justinian had killed Rufinus spread, impelling Khosrow to rally his troops and march into the enemy territory. When the shah approached Nisibis, however, he encountered Rufinus returning from his mission, and both retreated to continue negotiations. In October of that year, Rufinus was informed of an attack led by Huns-Sabirs that had reached as far away as the provinces of Euphratensis and Cilicia, and was instructed to confirm whether the Persians were behind the invasion. After confirming that they were not, he directed the magister militum of Armenia, Dorotheus, to deal with the situation.

As a result of the incident, Justinian refused to agree to hand over some forts from Lazica in the Caucasus, as had been previously agreed upon, which in turn caused Khosrow to react by not accepting his refusal. Rufinus was forced to act and persuaded Khosrow to return the money handed over during the negotiations, as well as withdraw from Byzantine territory with his armies. In the end, the other Byzantine emissaries involved in the matter made accusations against Rufinus so that he would fall out of favor with Justinian, which proved unsuccessful. The following year, likely in September according to the Edessa Chronicle, Rufinus and Hermogenes were again sent to the Sasanian court and finally managed to agree on the so-called Perpetual Peace. Nothing more is known about him.

Rufinus is described in the sources as a friend of Khosrow I, whom he would have met during his numerous embassies to the Persian court of Ctesiphon during the reign of Kavad I. As reported, he was extremely popular with the noble Persian courtiers due to the gifts distributed to them. He also possessed the appreciation of the Sasanian queen, Khosrow's mother, for having convinced the shah to accept her son as his successor and for having indicated the monk Moses, who cured her of a nagging illness.

== Bibliography ==
- Greatrex, Geoffrey; Lieu, Samuel N. C (2002). The Roman Eastern Frontier and the Persian Wars (Part II, 363–630 AD). London: Routledge. ISBN 0-415-14687-9.
- Martindale, John R., ed. (1980). The Prosopography of the Later Roman Empire: Volume II, AD 395–527. Cambridge: Cambridge University Press. ISBN 0-521-20159-4.
- Martindale, John R., ed. (1992). The Prosopography of the Later Roman Empire: Volume III, AD 527–641. Cambridge: Cambridge University Press. ISBN 0-521-20160-8.
