= Iberian =

Iberian refers to Iberia. Most commonly Iberian refers to:

- Someone or something originating in the Iberian Peninsula, namely from Spain, Portugal, Gibraltar and Andorra.

The term Iberian is also used to refer to anything pertaining to the former Kingdom of Iberia, an exonym for the Georgian kingdom of Kartli.

== Iberian Peninsula ==
- Iberians, one of the ancient Pre-Roman peoples of the Iberian Peninsula (not to be confused with the Celtiberians)
  - Iberian language, the language of the ancient Iberians
  - Iberian scripts, the writing scripts of the ancient Iberians
  - Iberian languages
  - Iberian Romance languages
    - Northeastern Iberian script
    - Southeastern Iberian script
    - Greco–Iberian alphabet
  - Basque and Iberian deities
  - Iberian weapons
- Iberian mountain range or Sistema Ibérico
- South-Western Iberian Bronze, Bronze Age culture of southern Portugal and nearby areas of Spain
- Iberian Union, a personal union between the crowns of Spain and Portugal from 1580 to 1640

== Ibero-America ==
- Ibero-America, a term since the second half of the 19th century to refer collectively to the countries in the Americas that are of Spanish and Portuguese origin
- Organization of Ibero-American States, an intergovernmental organization, comprising the Portuguese- and Spanish-speaking nations of the Americas and Europe, plus Equatorial Guinea in Africa

== Kingdom of Iberia ==
- Iberians, Greco-Roman designation for Georgians
  - Bacurius the Iberian, Georgian general
  - Martyrius the Iberian, Georgian calligrapher, monk and writer
  - Peter the Iberian, Georgian theologian and philosopher
  - Peranius the Iberian, Georgian general
  - Phazas the Iberian, Georgian cavalry officer
  - Pacurius the Iberian, Georgian military commander
  - Hilarion the Iberian, Georgian monk
  - John the Iberian, Georgian monk, founder of Iviron monastery on Mount Athos
  - Gabriel the Iberian, Georgian monk
  - Prochorus the Iberian, Georgian monk, founder of the Monastery of the Cross in Jerusalem
  - Anthim the Iberian, Georgian theologian, scholar; Metropolitan of Bucharest
- Iberian War, fought from 526 to 532 CE between the Eastern Roman Empire and Sassanid Empire over the eastern Georgian kingdom of Iberia

== Other ==
- Daily Iberian, newspaper in New Iberia, Louisiana
- Iberian horse, collective name of horse breeds native to the Iberian Peninsula
- Iberian lynx, critically endangered lynx native to the Iberian Peninsula
- Iberian wolf, subspecies of grey wolf inhabiting northern Portugal and northwestern Spain
- Iberian gauge, rail gauge used in Spain and Portugal

== See also ==
- Ibero-Caucasian languages (or Iberian-Caucasian languages)
- Kartvelian languages
- Hispanic and Hispanophone
- Lusitanic and Lusophone
