= Adolius =

Byzantine silentiarius and military officer

Adolius (Greek: 'Αδόλιος, d. 543 AD) was a Byzantine silentiarius and military officer, active in the reign of Justinian I (r. 527–565). He was a son of Acacius, proconsul of Armenia Prima (First Armenia). He is better known for his activities in the early stages of the Lazic War. The main source about him is Procopius.

== Biography ==
Procopius considers Acacius and his son Adolius to have been natives of Roman Armenia. He mentions that Adolius held the rank of silentiarius, though not mentioning the circumstances of his appointment.: "Adolius, the son of Acacius ... This Adolius was an Armenian by birth, and he always served the emperor while in the palace as privy counsellor (those who enjoy this honour are called by the Romans "silentiarii"), but at that time he was commander of some Armenians. And these men did as directed."

Acacius proved highly unpopular with the population of his province, gaining a reputation for cruelty and greed. He was assassinated in 538/539. A passage of Procopius names Artabanes as the killer. Adolius is mentioned urging Justinian I to act against the Armenian rebels responsible for the murder. He is implied to be very critical of Sittas, the general tasked with facing the revolt, and of Sittas' attempts to negotiate peace. The relative passages report: "So he [Sittas] came to Armenia, but at first he entered upon the war reluctantly and exerted himself to calm the people and to restore the population to their former habitations, promising to persuade the emperor to remit to them the payment of the new tax. But since the emperor kept assailing him with frequent reproaches for his hesitation, led on by the slanders of Adolius, the son of Acacius, Sittas at last made his preparations for the conflict."

Adolius is next mentioned in 542. At the time he was serving as a military officer in the Lazic War, leading his own troop of Armenians. His commanding officer was Belisarius, magister militum per Orientem. In "a display of military strength", Adolius and Diogenes were commanded to cross the Euphrates at the head of 1000 cavalry men. Once reaching the opposite bank of the river, this force started patrolling the area. They were apparently instructed to act as if ready to prevent the forces of Khosrau I from retreating. Procopius narrates: Belisarius ... commanded Diogenes, the guardsman, and Adolius, the son of Acacius, to cross the river with a thousand horsemen and to move about the bank there, always making it appear to the enemy that if they wished to cross the Euphrates and proceed to their own land, they would never permit them to do so."

When Khosrau I led the Sassanid Army across the Euphrates, Belisarius instructed Adolius and Diogenes to let them pass. Procopius explains: "Now Belisarius knew well that not even a hundred thousand men would ever be sufficient to check the crossing of Chosroes. For the river at many places along there can be crossed in boats very easily, and even apart from this the Persian army was too strong to be excluded from the crossing by an enemy numerically insignificant. But he had at first commanded the troops of Diogenes and Adolius, together with the thousand horsemen, to move about the bank at that point in order to confuse the barbarian by a feeling of helplessness. But after frightening this same barbarian, as I have said, Belisarius feared lest there should be some obstacle in the way of his departing from the land of the Romans. For it seemed to him a most significant achievement to have driven away from there the army of Chosroes, without risking any battle against so many myriads of barbarians with soldiers who were very few in number and who were in abject terror of the Median army. For this reason he commanded Diogenes and Adolius to remain quiet."

In 543, Adolius is mentioned serving under Peter. Peter and his forces joined Martinus, the new magister militum per Orientem, at the fortress of Citharizon. Said fortress was reportedly situated in the vicinity of Theodosiopolis (Erzurum). The Byzantine forces were gathering there to prepare for their next initiative: an invasion of Persarmenia. Eventually, Peter invaded the Sassanid Empire without notifying his fellow generals. Adolius presumably followed him. Meanwhile, Domnentiolus, Justus, Peranius, John, son of Nicetas and John the Glutton led their combined forces to Phison, near Martyropolis, and from there to the Persian border.

Peter's campaign led to the defeat of the Byzantines at Anglon. Adolius was killed in the subsequent retreat through hostile territories. Procopius concludes: "Adolius, while passing through a fortified place during this retreat--it was situated in Persarmenia--was struck on the head by a stone thrown by one of the inhabitants of the town, and died there."

== Sources ==
- Martindale, John R.; Jones, A.H.M.; Morris, John (1992), The Prosopography of the Later Roman Empire, Volume III: AD 527–641, Cambridge University Press, ISBN 0-521-20160-8
- Procopius of Caesarea; Dewing, Henry Bronson (1914), History of the wars. vol. 1, Books I-II, Cambridge University Press, ISBN 0-674-99054-4
