= Iberia (disambiguation) =

Iberia most often refers to the Iberian Peninsula in southwestern Europe.

Iberia may also refer to:

== Historical monarchies and regions ==
- Kingdom of Iberia (c. 302 BC–580 AD), an ancient Georgian kingdom
- Sasanian Iberia (523–626/627 AD), the eastern parts of Caucasian Georgia under direct Sasanian rule
- Principality of Iberia (580–880 AD), in early medieval Caucasian Georgia
- Kingdom of the Iberians (888–1008), a Georgian monarchy concentrated on historical lands of Tao and Klarjeti
- Iberia, Byzantine Empire (c. 1000–1074 AD), an administrative and military unit of the Byzantine Empire carved out of several Georgian lands

== Modern places ==
- Iberia District, Tahuamanu Province, Peru
- Iberia, Minnesota, United States, an unincorporated community
- Iberia, Missouri, United States, a city
- Iberia, Ohio, United States, a census-designated place
- Iberia Parish, Louisiana, United States

== Arts and entertainment ==
- Iberia (book), an illustrated travel book by James Michener
- Iberia (Albéniz), a piano suite by Isaac Albéniz
- Ibéria, the second of three sections of Images pour orchestre, a musical composition by Claude Debussy

== Sports ==
- Deportes Iberia, a Chilean football club based in Los Ángeles
- Iberia SC, a former Spanish football club based in Zaragoza, Aragon
- FC Iberia (disambiguation), various football clubs in Spain and Georgia

== Transportation ==
- Iberia (airline), the flag carrier and largest airline of Spain
- Level (airline), which uses the Iberia callsign
- Iberia Airport, Iberia District, Peru
- SS Iberia, several ships

== See also ==
- IberiaBank, an American financial holding company originating in New Iberia, Louisiana, United States (1887)
- Iberian (disambiguation)
