= Simmas =

Hun general

- Born: Late 5th century or early 6th century Pannonia
- Died: After 531

Simmas (Greek: Σίμμας; fl. 530) was a Hunnic general in the service of the Byzantine Empire, serving as dux (regional military commander). Active in the early 6th century, he fought at the Battle of Dara, commanding six hundred horseman along with fellow Hun commander Ascan, and played a fundamental role in the Byzantine victory.

== Biography ==
He fought for the Byzantines against the Sasanian Empire at the Battle of Dara in 530 AD, alongside fellow Hun commanders Aïgan, Ascan, and Sunicas. He and Ascan commanded the right-hand Hunnic cavalry force, whereas Aïgan and Sunicas commanded the left wing of the Hunnic cavalry.

During the battle, the Sasanian commander, Perozes, had concentrated his Immortals against the Byzantines to his left. The Byzantine generals countered this by stopping the action of Aïgan and Sunicas on the left and sending them to the right, where they joined Simmas and Ascan. The Huns were also backed by drafts from the center of the army. The Persians charged on, driving the Roman right wing; however, by doing this they left an open space between their left and their center, also exposing the shoulder of their charging left wing. The Huns then charged, cutting the advancing Sasanians' support while penetrating the wing up to its commander directing the fight from the rear. Sunicas killed the Persian standard-bearer, thus causing utter chaos. The advancing Persian wing was recalled. The Huns then attacked them from all parts, and Sunicas killed the Persian commander of the left wing. Next, the Roman wing counter-attacked, and the Persian army as a whole started to flee.

Simmas then fought in the Iberian War. He and Sunicas led the Hun cavalry at the Battle of Callinicum. In the latter part of this battle, he and Sunicas dismounted and fought alongside the infantry. The result of the battle was a Pyrrhic victory for the Sasanians. According to Malalas, Simmas and Ascan prevented the complete rout of the Byzantines.
