= Baresmanas =

- Died: 530
- Military career
- Allegiance: Sassanian Empire
- Rank: General
- Conflicts: Iberian War: Battle of Dara; Roman–Sasanian Wars

Baresmanas (Greek: Βαρεσμανᾶς) was an Sassanian Persian general. He is known only from his participation in the Battle of Dara in 530 against the Byzantines led by Belisarius, recorded by Procopius of Caesarea. In this battle, Baresmanas was the second-in-command of the Persian army under Perozes, and was killed during the fight by Sunicas. According to the account of Procopius, he was one-eyed.
