= Ascan =

Hun general

- Born: Late 5th century or early 6th century Pannonia (?)
- Died: 19 April 531 AD

Ascan (Greek: Ἀσκὰν; died 19 April 531) was a Byzantine dux of Hunnish descent. He fought at the Battle of Dara in 530, and at the Battle of Callinicum one year later, where he put up a brave fight when his flank was exposed, dying on the field.

== Biography ==
He was one of several warriors of Hunnic descent fighting for the Byzantine Empire; the Huns were known to "fight like tigers when driven to bay" and to "die sword in hand". Ascan fought at the Battle of Dara in 530 AD, where he commanded 600 horsemen (constituting the right-hand Hunnic cavalry force) together with fellow Hunnic commander Simmas. He, Simmas and the other two Hunnic commanders, Sunicas and Aïgan, played a fundamental role in the Roman victory of this battle.

He led the greater part of the Byzantine cavalry, made up of cataphracts, at the Battle of Callinicum. Here, the Persians tried to defeat the Romans as they had attempted at Dara in vain, by deploying their cavalry to try to attack a weak spot in the Roman army. Belisarius did not observe this action, which proved to be a turning point. The Ghassanids, allies of the Romans in this battle, were easily routed (so much so that suspicions of treachery later arose). The Byzantine Lycaonian infantry was no match for the Persian cavalry, and they were also routed, and their commanders killed. Finally, the right flank of Ascan's cavalry was exposed. He and his men fought as best as they could, but were ultimately defeated, and Ascan was killed.

George Philip Baker remarked that "as soon as Belisarius saw that Ascan, the Hun leader, was down, he knew what to expect." They dismounted and let loose their horses. The Byzantines, pressed against the river, formed a U-shaped phoulkon formation to defend themselves. They withstood the Persian attacks until nightfall, when they safely escaped across the Euphrates to Callinicum (modern-day Raqqa in Syria). The result of the battle was an inconclusive Sassanian Pyrrhic victory.
