= Acacius (proconsul) =

Acacius (Greek: Ἀκάκιος) was a Byzantine proconsul of Armenia Prima (First Armenia), c. 536–539 in the reign of Justinian I (r. 527–565). The main source about him is Procopius.

== Biography ==
Procopius considers Acacius and his son Adolius to have been natives of Roman Armenia: "Adolius, the son of Acacius ... This Adolius was an Armenian by birth, and he always served the emperor while in the palace as privy counsellor (those who enjoy this honour are called by the Romans "silentiarii"), but at that time he was commander of some Armenians. And these men did as directed."

Acacius is first mentioned when he brought forth accusations of treason against his friend Amazaspes. Justinian I arranged for Acacius to kill Amazaspes. Procopius reports that Justinian "gave over the villages to Amazaspes, the nephew of Symeon, and appointed him ruler over the Armenians. This Amazaspes, as time went on, was denounced to the Emperor Justinian by one of his friends, Acacius by name, on the ground that he was abusing the Armenians and wished to give over to the Persians Theodosiopolis and certain other fortresses. After telling this, Acacius, by the emperor's will, slew Amazaspes treacherously, and himself secured the command over the Armenians by the gift of the emperor."

On 18 March 536, a law of Justinian reformed the administration of Armenia. Acacius was already governor of Armenia Interior/Armenia Magna; his title was probably consularis of Armenia Magna. The reorganization named him governor of the new province of Armenia Prima (First Armenia) and gave him the title of proconsul. Further legal documents of 536 mention Acacius. He is called in "Latin" "proconsul Armeniae Primae" and in Greek as anthypatos of Armenia (Greek: ἀνθύπατος ΄Αρμενίας). One of these legal documents clarifies that the women of Armenia share the same rights of inheritance as the rest of the Roman (Byzantine) women.

Acacius proved highly unpopular with the population of his province, gaining a reputation for cruelty and greed. He was assassinated in 538/539. Procopius reports about him: "And being base by nature, he [Acacius] gained the opportunity of displaying his inward character, and he proved to be the most cruel of all men toward his subjects. For he plundered their property without excuse and ordained that they should pay an unheard-of tax of four centenaria. But the Armenians, unable to bear him any longer, conspired together and slew Acacius and fled for refuge to Pharangium." Another passage of Procopius names Artabanes as the killer.

== Sources ==
- Martindale, John R., ed. (1992). The Prosopography of the Later Roman Empire: Volume III, AD 527–641. Cambridge: Cambridge University Press. ISBN 0-521-20160-8.
- Procopius of Caesarea; Dewing, Henry Bronson (1914), History of the wars. vol. 1, Books I-II, Cambridge University Press, ISBN 0-674-99054-4
