= Iveria =

Iveria may refer to:

== Places ==
- Radisson Blu Iveria Hotel, Tbilisi, a hotel Georgia
- Iveria, an archaic name for the country of Georgia

== Other uses ==
- Iverian language or Mingrelian, spoken in Western Georgia
- FC Iveria Khashuri, a Georgian football club
- VIA Iveria, a Georgian music group from the 1970s–1980s
- Iveria (newspaper), a newspaper edited (1877–1905) by Ilia Chavchavadze

== See also ==
- Iberia (disambiguation)
