= Narses (comes) =

Narses (died 543) was an Armenian military commander in service of the Sasanian Empire and later the Byzantine Empire.

== Family ==
Narses was a native of Persarmenia, a part of Armenia under Sasanian Persian control. He was the brother of Aratius and Isaacius and possibly a member of the Kamsarakan family (a noble Armenian family of Parthian origin).

== Career ==
He is first recorded in 527 in service of the Sasanian military in the Iberian War, where he and his brother Aratius defeated Sittas and Belisarius in Persarmenia.

Both Narses and Aratius, accompanied by their mother, deserted to the Byzantine Empire in summer of 530 and were welcomed with a large sum of money by the imperial sacellarius Narses, also a Persarmenian. Their favorable reception also encouraged Isaacius to defect.

In c. 535, he was the commander of the troops in Philae, Egypt, where he destroyed the pagan shrines of the Nobades and Blemmyes, as ordered by the emperor Justinian I. His office was probably dux Thebaidis at this point. As comes rei militaris he was active in Italy and the East. He was among the commanders sent by the sea against the Ostrogoths to raise the Siege of Ariminum (538). He is mentioned several times commanding troops in Italy, including in Siege of Auximum in 539. In 540, Narses was sent away from Ravenna by Belisarius.

Narses was not given any military command until 543, when he was assigned a force of Armenians and Herules to fight the Sasanians. During the hasty invasion of 543 against Dvin, it was wrongly heard that the Sasanian army had left Anglon. Narses rebuked the other commanders for their slowness. In the Battle of Anglon that followed, there are sources that cite Narses and his forces were the first to engage. In this account, which drew from the records of Procopius, the Sasanian army (or part of it) was driven back or feigned retreat back into the village, but Narses was caught in an ambush by the Sasanians who were hiding in the houses. He was hit in the temple in close combat and his and other Byzantine forces were routed. His brother Isaacius carried him away from the battlefield, but he died of his wound soon afterward.
