= Battle of Satala =

Battle of Satala can refer to:

- Battle of Satala (298), between the Romans under Galerius and the Sassanid Persians under Narseh
- Battle of Satala (530), between the Eastern Romans under Sittas and the Sassanid Persians under Mihr-Mihroe
