= Marcellus (general under Justinian I) =

Marcellus (Greek: Μάρκελλος) was an East Roman (Byzantine) general during the early reign of Emperor Justinian I (r. 527–565).

== Biography ==
Marcellus is first mentioned by the 6th-century historian Procopius as taking part under Belisarius in the Battle of Dara against the Sassanid Persians in 530. He was one of the commanders of the Byzantine army's right wing. In the Vandalic War of 533–534, he was one of the commanders of the foederati detachments, and fought in the Battle of Tricamarum and (presumably) in the Battle of Ad Decimum, where the foederati were defeated with great loss by the Vandals.

After the conquest of the Vandal Kingdom was complete, Marcellus remained in Africa, and by 536 he was appointed to the post of dux Numidiae, while sharing command over the foederati of Numidia with Cyril. In summer 536, he set out to confront the rebel Stotzas, but he convinced Marcellus's soldiers to desert, and Marcellus with the other officers sought sanctuary at a local church. Stotzas convinced them to surrender on guarantees for their safety, but as soon as they did so, they were executed.

== Sources ==
- Martindale, John R., ed. (1992). The Prosopography of the Later Roman Empire: Volume III, AD 527–641. Cambridge: Cambridge University Press. ISBN 0-521-20160-8.
