= Siege of Edessa (544) =

544 AD siege of Byzantine Edessa by the Sasanian Empire

Date	March – April 544 AD
Location	Edessa, Mesopotamia, Byzantine Empire (modern-day Şanlıurfa, Turkey) 37.15°N 38.8°E
Result	Byzantine victory
Territorial changes	Siege abandoned; Edessanes pay 5 centenaria of gold to the Sasanians

Belligerents
Sasanian Empire; Huns; Lakhmids (not engaged)	Byzantine Empire; Huns

Commanders and leaders
Khosrow I; Azarethes	Martinus; Peranius; Peter
- Location within West and Central Asia Siege of Edessa (544) (Turkey)

The siege of Edessa (then known as Justinopolis) occurred in 544 AD during an invasion of the Byzantine Empire ruled by Justinian I by the Sasanian Empire under Khosrow I in the midst of the ongoing Lazic War in the north. The city withstood the fierce siege. Due to the religious nature of the city, some Christian traditions have attributed the result of the conflict to divine intervention.

== Background ==
In the midst of the initial phase of the Lazic War, Khosrow I was encouraged to invade via the Mesopotamian front. It was the fourth invasion of the Byzantine territory by Khosrow I. Edessa and Dara were the main strongholds of Roman Mesopotamia at the time. The Byzantine historian Procopius has provided an especially detailed account of the siege.

== Siege ==
After a minor skirmish which ended in a stalemate, the Sasanians offered the Byzantines to buy peace, but the negotiations failed as the Byzantines rejected the condition of giving up all the wealth inside the fortifications.

On the eighth day, the Sasanians began constructing a large mound (in Latin: agesta) made of trees, earth, and rubble, against the city wall. The Byzantines made attempts to stop its construction, first by a surprise raid, and then by shooting, but the construction continued. Thus they sent Stephanus to negotiate with Khosrow I; he was a physician who had previously cured Khosrow I's father, Kavad I. Khosrow I demanded the delivery of Peter and Peranius, or alternatively payment of 500 centenaria of gold, or all of the silver and gold that was in the city; this offer was refused. As the mound reached a great height, another envoy was sent to the Sasanian camp, but they were insulted and sent back. The Byzantines tried to over-top the wall opposite the mound by constructing a new structure, but this failed. Martinus then engaged in frequent peace talks with Sasanian commanders.

Meanwhile, the Byzantines were tunneling to reach the middle of the mound, and although a first tunnel was discovered, the Byzantines eventually managed to set fire to the mound from beneath using sulfur, bitumen, and wood. After unsuccessful attempts to extinguish the fire, the entire mound was eventually consumed by fire and the Sasanians abandoned it.

A surprise Sasanian assault using ladders at dawn, and another assault against the "Great Gate" later in the day were defeated. The Sasanians then announced that Rhecinarius, the envoy from Emperor Justinian I to arrange the peace treaty, had arrived. As the envoy entered the city, the Byzantines refused to begin negotiations immediately. Khosrow I then encircled the city with all the army and siege equipment. The ensuing assault initially favored the Sasanians, but it eventually failed and Khosrow I ordered a withdrawal. The Sasanian contingent under Azarethes was still fighting and making progress at one of the gates, but were driven back by the regrouped Byzantines and citizens under Peranius.

Another Sasanian assault against another one of the gates two days later was also unsuccessful, and then an armistice was agreed upon as the Edessanes paid 5 centenaria (500 pounds) of gold.

== Aftermath ==
A five-year truce was agreed between the Sasanians and the Byzantines a year later in 545.

Some Christian traditions attribute the successful defense to the Image of Edessa, a holy relic that was kept in the city. Others such as the Syriac Chronicle of Edessa written in the same decade that the siege occurred, also claim divine interventions. Nevertheless, the city later fell in 610 during the Byzantine–Sasanian War of 602–628.
