= Azarethes =

Sassanid Persian military commander

- Military career
- Allegiance: Sasanian Empire
- Branch: Sasanian army
- Rank: "Astabadh" or hazaraft
- Commands: Persian forces in Mesopotamia
- Conflicts: Iberian War: Battle of Callinicum; Khosrow I's second Roman campaign: Siege of Edessa (544)

Azarethes (Greek: Ἀζαρέθης), also recorded as Exarath (Ἑξαράθ) and Zuraq, was a Sassanid Persian military commander during the Byzantine–Sassanid Wars. His Greek name is possibly a misunderstanding of the honorific title hazaraft.

== Biography ==
According to the account of Procopius (De bello Persico, I.18), Azarethes was placed in command of the Persian army in Mesopotamia after the Persian defeat in the Battle of Dara in 530. Procopius calls him an "exceptionally able warrior", and Zacharias of Mytilene records that he held the rank of astabadh. In 531, together with his Lakhmid allies, he led an invasion across the Euphrates into the Byzantine region of Commagene (more probably Chalybonitis). When the Byzantine army under Belisarius approached, they withdrew east, halting at Callinicum. In the ensuing battle, the Byzantines suffered a heavy defeat, but Persian losses were also so high that the Persian king Kavadh I (r. 488–531) was displeased with him and relieved him of his command.

He only reappears in the sources once, in 544, when he accompanied Kavadh's successor, Khosrau I (r. 531–579), at the siege of Edessa (544). In the last stage of the siege, when the Persians under Khosrow I withdrew from their second general assault, Azarethes and his men were the only Persians who were still fighting and making progress at one of the city gates. They were repelled by regrouped Romans under Peranius.
