= FC Iberia =

FC Iberia or similar may refer to the following association football clubs:

In Georgia

- FC Iveria Khashuri, a club in Khashuri
- FC Iberia Tbilisi, the 1990–1992 name for FC Dinamo Tbilisi
- FC Iberia Samtredia, the 1998–2001 name for FC Samtredia
- FC Iberia 1999, the name since 2024 of the former FC Saburtalo, in Saburtalo, Tbilisi; champions in 2024 and 2025
- FC Iberia 2010, a club in Tbilisi founded in 2010; promoted in 2025 from 4th to 3rd level

In Spain

- Iberia FC, a 1903–1907 club in Madrid
- Iberia SC, a 1916–1932 club in Zaragoza

In Chile

- Deportes Iberia, in Los Ángeles

== See also ==
- Iberia (disambiguation)
- Las Ibéricas F.C., 1971 Spanish film starring José Sacristán
