= Skande =

Skande სკანდე
- Village
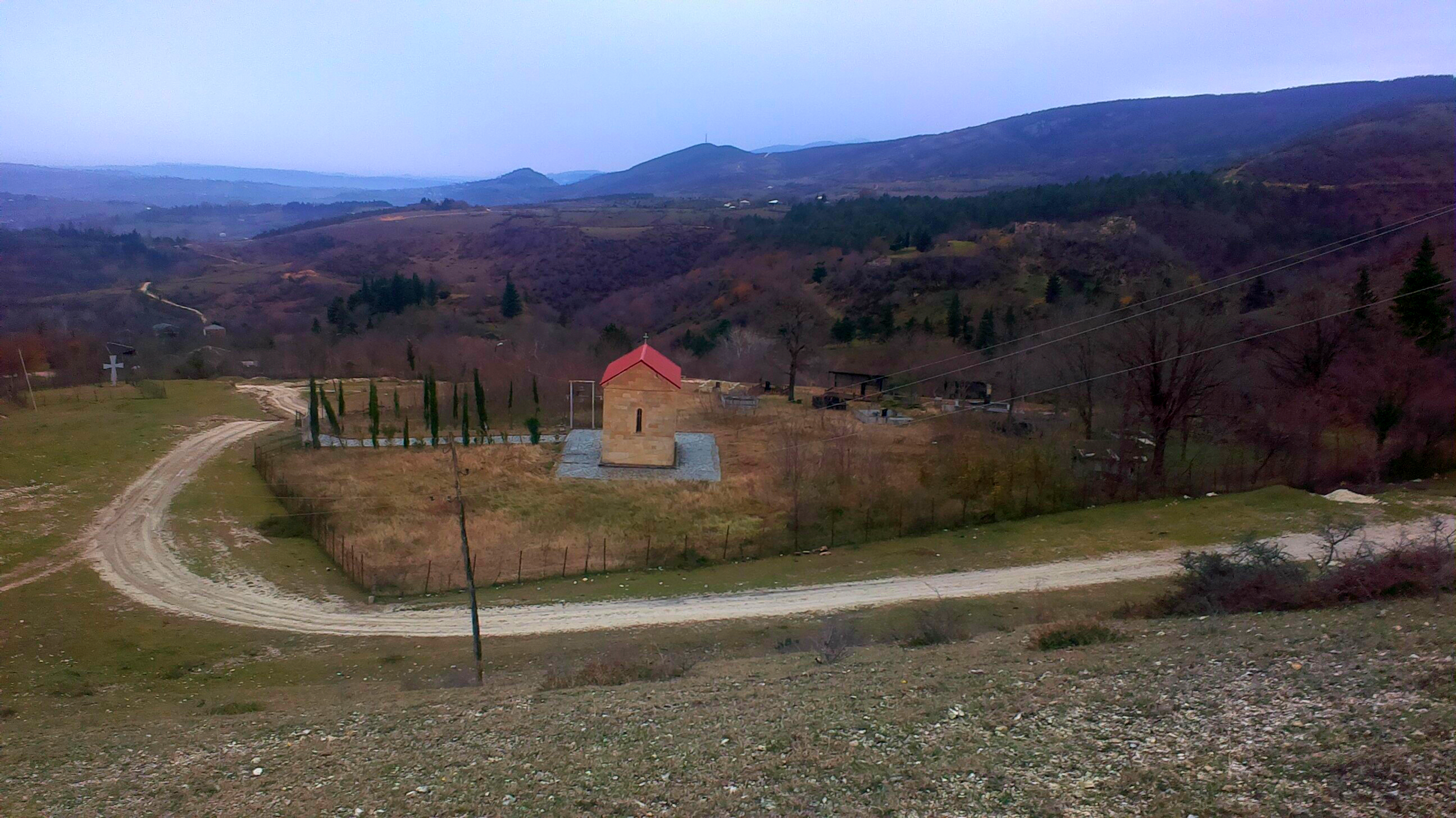
- Church in Skande

- Location of Skande
- Coordinates: 42°15′50″N 43°02′53″E
- Country: Georgia
- Region: Imereti
- Municipality: Terjola
- Elevation: 400 m (1,300 ft)

Population (2014)
  - Total: 434
- Time zone: UTC+4 (Georgian Time)

Skande (Georgian: სკანდე), sometimes known as Skanda (სკანდა), is a village in the Terjola Municipality, Imereti, Georgia. It is located in western part of the country, in the small river valley of Chkhari, part of the Kvirila River system, some 15 km northeast of the town of Terjola. According to the 2014 census, its population was 434.

Skanda is home to a ruined fortress, which is the Scanda or Scandeis of the Eastern Roman authors of Late Antiquity and one of the strongholds contested between the Eastern Roman and Sasanian empires during their conflicts in Lazica. It maintained its importance as one of the key fortresses of Imereti down to the early 19th century.

== History ==
=== Late Antiquity ===
Skanda is referenced in the Eastern Roman sources, such as the Novellae by the emperor Justinian I and historical accounts of the eponymous era, e.g. by Procopius and Menander Protector, as a fortress in the hinterland of Lazica, a kingdom on the Black Sea contested between the Eastern Roman and Sasanian Persian empires. The fortress of Skanda, coupled with that of Sarapanis, stood in difficult terrain, guarding the eastern approaches to the country, by the boundary of Iberia. Around 522, shortly after Lazica accepted the Eastern Roman suzerainty, the Laz garrisons of these two frontier strongholds were substituted with the imperial troops, who soon abandoned them due to logistical difficulties. The Sasanian forces moved in and continued to occupy the fortresses until after the conclusion of the "Eternal Peace" in 532. The Laz destroyed both Skanda and Sarapanis in order to deny the Sasanian military the means of using them in the future, but, as the hostilities resumed in Lazica, the Persians restored Skanda in 551 and held it throughout the course of the conflict, for nearly 25 years.

=== Middle Ages and Early Modern Era ===
Records on the history of Skanda during the High Middle Ages are scarce. The early 11th-century unification of the Kingdom of Georgia—of which the former territories of Lazica and Iberia were parts—deprived Skanda of its past strategic importance as a frontier fortress. By the mid-15th century, as the Kingdom of Imereti was emerging independent from a war-torn Georgia, Skanda rose to prominence once again. Beyond native historical documents, it was mentioned by the foreign visitors of Georgia, such as Giosafat Barbaro and Ambrogio Contarini in the 1470s, Nikifor Tolochanov and Aleksey Yevlyev in the 1650s, Jean Chardin in the 1660s, and Johann Anton Güldenstädt in the 1770s. Skanda was a battleground amidst a series of internecine conflicts that plagued the country from the 16th century into the 18th.

The Russian envoys Tolochanov and Yevlyev, touring Imereti in the 1650s, visited Skanda—then a favorite summer residence of King Alexander III of Imereti—several times and described it as a well-built fortress atop a hill in a rugged river valley, enveloped by a 20 m-high and 600 m-long brick wall and fortified with four towers planted with cannons. Within the walls were a palace of three stories, church of St. George, and deposit of the king's riches. A decade later, the Frenchman Jean Chardin found Skanda already in decline. It was later restored by the government of Imereti. The Georgian historian, Prince Vakhushti of Kartli, compiling his geography of Georgia in 1745, referred to Skanda as the location of a royal palace and "a great citadel of imposing construction". After the Russian conquest of Imereti in 1810, the fortress of Skanda was abandoned and left to fall in ruins. In the 1830s, the Swiss scholar Frédéric Dubois de Montpéreux found Skanda "no more than a ruin, long since abandoned".

== Skanda fortress ==
The fortress of Skanda stands in ruins north of the homonymous village, on a hill between two streams (42°16′6″N 43°2′46″E). Its area totals 7,000 m^{2} and height reaches 120 m. Relatively better preserved are the eastern façade of a royal palace and walls of a church which contains a Georgian inscription. The monument was archaeologically studied in 1949 and 1995. Most of the materials uncovered were from the late Middle Ages. The earliest structures of the fortress were dated by the researcher of Skanda, Lekvinadze, to the 4th century. The Skanda complex is inscribed by the government of Georgia on the registry of the Immovable Monuments of National Significance.

== Population ==
As of the 2014 national census, Skande had a population of 434. Most of them (99%) are ethnic Georgians.

Population	2002 census	2014 census
Total	561	434
