= Gadar the Kadisene =

Gadar was a prominent Sasanian military commander of the early 6th century AD. He was a leader of the Kadiseni (or Cadiseni), a warlike tribe integrated into the Sasanian military structure, and is primarily remembered for his role in the Anastasian War against the Byzantine Empire. Nina Pigulevskaya identifies the Cadiseni (often appearing in Syriac sources as Kadishaye) as a distinct group, typically associated with the Hephthalite (White Hun) confederation and with the ancient Cadusii.

== Biography ==
Gadar served under the Sasanian King of Kings, Kavad I. He commanded a contingent of Kadiseni tribesmen, who were renowned for their ferocity and lived on the frontiers of the Sasanian Empire.
