= Iberian War =

6th-century conflict between the Byzantine and Sassanid empires

- Part of the Byzantine–Sasanian Wars
- The Roman-Persian frontier in the 4th to 7th centuries. Iberia is at the top of the map, between the Black and Caspian seas.
Date	526–532 AD
Location	Iberia, Transcaucasus, Upper Mesopotamia
Result	Inconclusive: Treaty of Eternal Peace; Sasanians retained Iberia; Byzantines retained Lazica

Belligerents
Byzantine Empire: Iberia; Lazica; Ghassanids; Huns; Heruli; Aksum; Kinda	Sasanian Empire: Lakhmids; Sabirs

Commanders and leaders
Justin I Justinian I Belisarius; Sittas; Gregory; Hermogenes; Pharas; John of Lydia; Sunicas; Tzath I of Lazica; Jabalah IV ibn al-Harith †; Al-Harith ibn Jabalah; Dorotheus; Domnentiolus (POW); Al-Harith of Kinda †; Aïgan; Simmas; Ascan	Kavadh I Perozes; Xerxes; Azarethes; Bawi; Mihr-Mihroe; Chanaranges; Baresmanas †; Pityaxes; Al-Mundhir III ibn al-Nu'man; Aratius; Khosrow I

The Iberian War was fought from 526 to 532 between the Byzantine Empire and the Sasanian Empire over the eastern Georgian kingdom of Iberia—a Sasanian client state that defected to the Byzantines. Conflict erupted amid tensions over tribute and the spice trade.

The Sasanians maintained the upper hand until 530 but the Byzantines recovered their position in battles at Dara and Satala while their Ghassanid allies defeated the Sasanian-aligned Lakhmids. A Sasanian victory at Callinicum in 531 continued the war for another year until the empires signed the Perpetual Peace.

== Origin ==
After the Anastasian War, a seven-year truce was agreed on, yet it lasted for nearly twenty years. Even during the war in 505, Emperor Anastasius I had already started fortifying Dara as a counter to the Persian fortress city of Nisibis for a looming conflict. During the reign of Justin I, investment in fortification efforts were increased in Dara.

Fearing the security of his succession, the elderly Kavadh I (r. 488–531) proposed the adoption of his favoured son Khosrow I by the Emperor Justin I. Whilst initially optimistic of the proposal, Procopius writes that Justin's quaestor Proklos advised against an adoption out of a fear that Khosrow could use it as pretext to claim the Roman Empire. Justin would instead request a barbarian adoption, by an attire of arms, which would offend Khosrow.

Tensions in the region were compounded by religious affiliations. Lazica, a Christian Kingdom typically allied with the Persians, converted to Christianity and shifted allegiances to the Romans. Their king symbolically adopted Emperor Justin as his godfather. This shift motivated other Christian kingdoms in the Caucasus, such as Iberia, to defect from Persia.

According to Procopius, Kavadh I tried to force the Christian Iberians to become Zoroastrians, and in 523, under the leadership of Gourgen, they rose in revolt against Persia, following the example of the neighboring Christian kingdom of Lazica. Gourgen received pledges by Justin I that he would defend Iberia. Procopius consistently uses religious motifs, contrasting the Zoroastrian Persian's barbarism with the Christian Roman's civility.

As part of his strategic consolidation of power in the East, Justinian further solidified border defences, incorporating Armenian provinces into the empire and stationing Roman garrisons in the area. Additionally, he aligned pro-Roman Arab clans under the Christian Jafnid Clan, whose leader was appointed king, providing a buffer zone between Rome and Persia.

== War ==
Violence escalated at various points where the power of the two empires met: in 525 a Roman fleet transported an Aksumite army to conquer Himyarite Yemen and in 525–526, Persia's Arab allies, the Lakhmids, raided Roman territories on the edge of the desert. The Romans were interested in gaining influence in Yemen to protect Christian interests there (see Christian community of Najran) as well as to dominate the spice and silk trade routes to India which were under Persian control.

By 526–527, overt fighting between the two empires had broken out in the Transcaucasus region and upper Mesopotamia. Following the emperor Justin I's death in 527, Justinian I acceded to the imperial throne. The early years of war favored the Persians, by 527 the Iberian revolt had been crushed, a Roman offensive against Nisibis and Thebetha in that year failed and forces attempting to fortify Thannuris and Melabasa were prevented from doing so by Persian attacks.

In 528, the Persians pressed on from Iberia to capture forts in eastern Lazica. Attempting to remedy the deficiencies revealed by these Persian successes, Justinian reorganised the eastern armies by dividing the command of the magister militum of the East in two and appointing a separate magister militum of Armenia over the northern portion. Belisarius's forces were defeated by Xerxes during the battle of Thannuris and he had to retreat to Dara.

In response to damaging raids on Syria by the Lakhmids from 528 to 529, Justinian reorganised the loose network of Arab rulers employed by the Romans under the sole leadership of Ghassanid leader Al-Harith ibn Jabalah, who was raised to the rank of Vir gloriosus. Such reform mirrored the more centralised approach of Persia, whose own Arabic clients had been organised under Lakhmid leader Al-Mundhir III ibn al-Nu'man.

In 530, Belisarius led the Romans to victory over a much larger Persian force under Perozes at the Battle of Dara, while Sittas and Dorotheus defeated a Persian army under Mihr-Mihroe at the Battle of Satala. In 531, Belisarius was defeated by Persian and Lakhmid forces at the Battle of Callinicum but during the summer, the Romans captured some forts in Armenia and repulsed a Persian offensive. The Roman failure at Callinicum was followed by a commission of inquiry; Belisarius was dismissed from his post. Azarethes, the Persians' commander at Callinicum, was also stripped of his ranks due to his failure to capture any significant fortification.

== Truce ==
Justinian's envoy, Hermogenes, visited Kavadh to re-open negotiations but without success. Justinian tried to form an alliance with the Axumites of Ethiopia and the Himyarites of Yemen against the Persians but his alliance proposal failed. The Persians conducted the Siege of Martyropolis but abandoned it as Kavadh died shortly afterwards.

In spring 532 negotiations progressed after the succession of King Khosrow I, who needed to devote attention to domestic threats. Justinian too favoured an early end to the war, potentially viewing dynastic instability in Vandalic Africa and Ostrogothic Italy as encouragement to reallocate Roman forces in the east towards the western Mediterranean. Negotiations concluded with the agreement of Eternal Peace, whereby all territories seized during the war by either side were returned and the Dux of eastern forces moved from Dara to Constantia. However, the Byzantines paid a tribute of 11,000 lbs (5000 kg) of gold to the Sasanian Empire in exchange for the truce.

== See also ==
- Aksumite–Persian wars
- Lazic War

== Sources ==
- Barker, John W. (1966). Justinian and the Later Roman Empire. Madison: University of Wisconsin Press. ISBN 978-0-29-903944-8.
- Greatrex, Geoffrey; Lieu, Samuel N. C. (2002). "Justinian's First Persian War and the Eternal Peace". The Roman Eastern Frontier and the Persian Wars (Part II, 363–630 AD). New York and London: Routledge. pp. 82–97. ISBN 978-0-415-14687-6.
- Fisher, Greg (2019). Rome, Persia, and Arabia: shaping the Middle East from Pompey to Muhammad. London: Routledge. ISBN 9780429356483.
- Hughes, Ian (2009). Belisarius: The Last Roman General. South Yorkshire: Pen & Sword Military. ISBN 9781844158331.
- Neusner, Jacob (1970). A History of the Jews in Babylonia, Part 5. Later Sasanian Times. Brill. ISBN 978-90-04-50893-4.
- Sarris, Peter (2011). Empires of Faith: The Fall of Rome to the Rise of Islam, 500–700. Oxford: Oxford University Press. ISBN 9780191620027.
