= Battle of Anglon =

Early phase of the Lazic War

- Part of the Lazic War
Date	543 AD
Location	Anglon village near Dvin, Armenia, Sasanian Empire
Result	Sasanian victory

Belligerents
Byzantine Empire; Herules	Sasanian Empire

Commanders and leaders
Martin; Peter; Valerian; Narses †; Isaacius; Theoctistus; Adolius †; Philemouth; Verus	Nabedes

Units involved
All forces of the magister militum per Orientem, per Armeniam, and possibly some of the praesentalis	Sasanian forces of Persarmenia

Strength
30,000 (20,000+ engaged)	4,000

Casualties and losses
Heavy	Unknown

The Battle of Anglon took place in 543 AD, during the Byzantine (East Roman) invasion of Sasanian-ruled Armenia ("Persarmenia").

After receiving the news of a rebellion in Persia and an epidemic in King Khosrow I's army, the Byzantine armies in the East under the orders of Emperor Justinian I initiated a hasty invasion of Persarmenia. The outnumbered Persian forces in the region performed a meticulous ambush at the mountainous fortress of Anglon, decisively defeating the Byzantine forces in a siege-like confrontation.

== Background ==
The Sasanian ruler Khosrow I began an invasion of Commagene in 542, but retreated to Adurbadagan and halted at Adhur Gushnasp, intending to begin a campaign against Byzantine Armenia. The Romans had been negotiating with Khosrow I, until they received information about the epidemic of the so-called Plague of Justinian in Khosrow I's force and a rebellion in Persia by the prince Anoshazad. Seeing this as an opportunity, Emperor Justinian I ordered all Roman forces in the East to invade Sasanian Armenia.

== Roman invasion ==
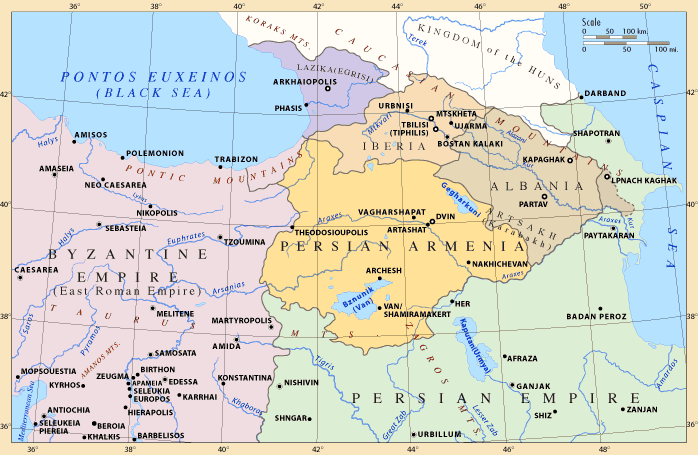
Map of the Sasanian Armenia.

Martin was the newly-appointed Master of Soldiers in the East (magister militum per Orientem) at the time, but according to primary sources did not have much authority over other generals. The Roman invasion force, which numbered 30,000 in total, was initially scattered:

- Martin and his forces, stationed in Citharizum with Ildeger and Theoctistus
- Peter and Adolius and their forces
- Valerian, the magister militum per Armeniam, stationed near Theodosiopolis; joined by Narses (a Persarmenian) and his regiment of Heruls (under Philemouth and Verus) and Armenians

Justus, Peranius, Domnentiolus, John, son of Nicetas, and John the Glutton stayed at Phison, near Martyropolis. They raided Taraunitis (Taron) and then retreated.

The target of the offensive was Dvin, the capital of Sasanian Armenia. The city was an important commercial center in the region, and it had ample supplies and was suitable for cavalry action. Besides, it was the place where the Christian envoys who were likely to switch to the Roman side came from. According to Syvänne, the Catholicos and his brother may have planned the operation together with Valerian.

Persian forces in Persarmenia numbered 4,000 and were under the command of Nabedes. They concentrated at the mountainous village of Anglon about 13 miles (21 km) from Dvin (probably identical to Ankes/Angegh/Angel, Dsakhgodn Canton, Ayrarat Province, Kingdom of Armenia) The Anglon village featured a namesake fortress perched on top of the precipitous mountain and surrounded by village houses which crowded in a narrow space. Nabedes prepared a defensive position for an elaborate ambush by blocking the entrances to the village with stones and carts, digging "a sort of trench", and setting up ambushes in the houses of the village outside the fortress, while marshaling an army below. Some were stationed in the fortress itself, constituting the last element of the ambush.

The Roman forces united only after crossing the Persian border, in the plain of Dvin. It probably numbered more than 20,000. Peter advanced first, probably as a vanguard. The Romans had been marching in strict formations, but as soon as they found out that the Persians are concentrated in Anglon, they spread out to plunder. According to Procopius, the Roman generals lacked a proper union among themselves (cf. #Analysis). One day's march from Anglon, a captured Persian spy told the Romans that Nabedes has fled. As the Roman forces proceeded into the rough terrain of Anglon, they probably assumed that Persians are hiding in the fortifications. Soon Roman scouts informed their commanders of the presence of a Persian army in the open. Upon receiving this news, the Roman army hastily formed a single-line formation. Martin's forces formed the center, Peter's forces formed the right, and Valerian's forces (probably joined by Narses and his Heruls and Armenians) formed the left. The formation was imperfect due to roughness of the terrain and the fact that it was formed on the spur of the moment. The Persians were arranged in a small space. Nabedes had ordered them not to begin fighting unless after being attacked.

(1) The Romans attacked the Persians in the field. (2) The attacked Persians retreated (or feigned retreat) through the village toward the fortress. The lightly-armored Romans and Heruls chased them.

(1) The Persians ambushed from houses. (2) Persian archers attacked the Heruls in the open area and the trapped Roman cavalry in the narrow alleys. (3) A hidden force sallied from the fortress, routing the Romans.

Narses and his regulars and Heruls were the first to engage the Persians in close combat. Apparently, part of the Persian army was defeated, and the Persian cavalry retreated (or feigned retreat) toward the fortress via a narrow way. Their flight was followed by Narses and his men as koursores. The rest of the Romans joined, too. As the pursuing Romans passed through the narrow streets and rough terrain of the village under the fort, the Persians (presumably dismounted cavalrymen) launched their ambush from the village buildings outside the fortress, attacking the Heruls and killing their commander Narses in close combat. Other Roman cavalrymen that had followed Narses' forces were now trapped in the rough terrain in narrow alleys. Nabedes ordered a general counter-attack that included a sortie of the Persians who sallied out from the fortress and shot against the masses of the Romans, especially the lightly-armored Heruls in the open area and other Romans that were trapped in narrow alleys. The Romans and their commanders panicked and fled, leaving their heavy equipment (including arms, armor, draft animals, and baggage train) behind. The Persians did not pursue them beyond the rough terrain out of fear of an ambush by the much larger Romans, but the Romans continued to flee from the region. Adolius was among those killed in the retreat.

== Analysis ==
The only source describing the battle is the Roman historian Procopius, whose account is especially critical of the Roman army's performance in the campaign. However, modern sources have disputed his assessments.

The force in the battle is considered an example of the "inadequacy" of many of the recruited soldiers. Others note the lack of coordination between the Roman generals. However, according to J. B. Bury, Procopius (who was a companion of General Belisarius) has exaggerated the incompetence of the Roman generals in this campaign and the severity of their defeat. Petersen, too, considers aspects of Procopius' description of the battle—including the division of the Roman army and their staggered deployment—to be a distorted description of what were actually intentional military strategies and tactics in face of logistical constraints and the need for mutually supportive columns. The soldiers "mixed in with the baggage train" were probably protecting valuable siege equipment and supplies. Despite Procopius' assessment that the force was poorly organized and led, the Romans in fact managed to swiftly deploy to face the Persian army in the field and defeat them in the first encounter. Sarantis et al. (2013) focuses on the meticulous ambush by the defenders, describing it as "heroic".

Anglon is an example of the less common form of defensive fortification in which settlements are outside the defensive structures; this is sometimes seen in the Caucasus. Another example is seen in the siege of Tzacher/Sideroun in 557.

The outcome of the battle gave the Persians momentum in the Lazic War.
