= Iberia, Minnesota =

Unincorporated community in Minnesota, US

Iberia
- Unincorporated community
- Location within Minnesota Location within the United States
- Country: United States
- State: Minnesota
- County: Brown
- Elevation: 1,010 ft (310 m)
- Time zone: UTC-6 (Central (CST))
  - Summer (DST): UTC-5 (CDT)
- Area code: 507
- GNIS feature ID: 654764

Iberia is an unincorporated community in Brown County, in the U.S. state of Minnesota.

== History ==
A post office was established at Iberia in 1870, and remained in operation until it was discontinued in 1893. The community was named after the Iberian Peninsula.
