= Battle of Satala (530) =

530 battle of the Iberian War

- Part of the Iberian War
- Map of the Byzantine-Persian frontier
Date	June 530
Location	Satala, Byzantine Armenia (today's Turkey) 40.050°N 39.600°E
Result	Byzantine victory

Belligerents
Sassanid Empire; Persarmenians; Sunitae; Sabirs	Byzantine Empire

Commanders and leaders
Mermeroes	Sittas; Dorotheus

Strength
30,000	15,000

The Battle of Satala took place in June 530 between the forces of the Byzantine Empire and the Sassanid (Persian) Empire, near Satala in Byzantine Armenia.

The Persian general Mermeroes led an army into Byzantine territory, intending to capture Satala, which was defended by a smaller Byzantine force commanded by Sittas and Dorotheus. The Persians camped near the city and prepared to surround it the following day.

A small Byzantine detachment under Sittas was in the surrounding hills and moved to attack the Persians once they began surrounding the city. The Persians, unaware of the size of the Byzantine detachment, turned and confronted it. At this point, Dorotheus and the main Byzantine army within the city attacked the Persian army from the rear, trapping the Persians between two Byzantine forces. The Persians held their ground because of their numerical superiority. However, during the battle, the Byzantine commander Florentius the Thracian led an attack on the Persian center and captured the Persian battle standard. Although he was killed shortly afterward, the loss of the battle standard caused panic among the Persians and they retreated. The victory led to a number of Armenian defections and fortresses coming under Byzantine control.

== Background ==
The Iberian War was a conflict between the Byzantine Empire under Emperor Justinian I and the Sasanian Empire under King Kavad I, driven to influence the Kingdom of Iberia near the Caucasus region. The war began after the Iberian king rebelled against Persian rule and sought Byzantine support. Fighting took place across regions of Armenia and Mesopotamia. Initially, the Persians had the upper hand with the victory in the Battle of Thannuris. However, a subsequent Persian attempt to break through the Byzantine fortified settlements failed, allowing the Byzantines to regain morale after the battle at Dara. In the meantime, the Persians had gained ground in the Caucasus, having subdued Iberia and invaded Lazica. The Persian shah, Kavad I (r. 488–531), decided to take advantage of this and sent an army under the general Mermeroes into Byzantium's Armenian provinces.

Mermeroes assembled his forces near the Byzantine border fortress of Theodosiopolis (modern-day Erzurum). According to contemporary historian Procopius, the Persian army was composed mostly of levies from Persian-ruled Armenia and Sunitae from the northern Caucasus, as well as 3,000 Sabirs. The size of the Persian army was 30,000. The Byzantine commanders were Sittas, who had just been promoted from magister militum per Armeniam to magister militum praesentalis, and Dorotheus, his successor in the former post. As soon as news of the ongoing Persian preparations reached them, they sent two of their guards to spy on them. One was captured, but the other returned with information that allowed the Byzantines to launch a surprise attack on the Persian camp. The Persian army scattered with some loss. After looting the Persian camp, the Byzantines returned to their base.

== Battle ==
Once Mermeroes had finished assembling his army, he invaded Byzantine territory. Bypassing Theodosiopolis, he headed for Satala and set up his camp some distance from the city walls. The Byzantine forces, about half as strong as the Persians according to Procopius, did not engage him. Sittas, with a thousand men, occupied the hills around the city, while the bulk of the Byzantine army remained with Dorotheus inside the walls.

The next day, the Persians advanced and began to surround the city, preparing for a siege. At this point, Sittas with his detachment sallied forth from the hills. The Persians, seeing them raising much dust and thinking that they were the main Byzantine army, quickly gathered their forces and turned to meet them. Dorotheus then led his own men to attack the Persian rear. Despite their bad tactical position, facing attack from both front and rear, the Persian army resisted effectively, due to its greater numbers. The tide of the battle changed when a Byzantine commander, Florentius the Thracian, charged his unit into the Persian center and managed to capture Mermeroes's battle standard. Although he was killed soon after, the loss of the flag caused fear among the Persian ranks. (Note: Historian Ilkka Syvänne argues that the actions of a single individual determined the outcome of the battle.) The Persians began to retreat to their camp, abandoning the battlefield. According to Procopius, the Byzantines did not pursue the retreating Persians as they were satisfied with the victory over a numerically superior army.

== Aftermath ==
The next day, the Persians departed and returned to Persian Armenia, unmolested by the Byzantines, who were satisfied with their victory over a larger force. This victory was followed by the defections of a number of Armenian chieftains to the Byzantine Empire (the brothers Narses, Aratius, and Isaac), as well as by the capture or surrender of a number of important fortresses of Bolum and Pharangium. Pharangium was considered an important loss because it was a source of gold, impacting the ability of the Persians to finance the war. Negotiations between Persia and Byzantium also resumed after the battle, but they led nowhere, and in spring 531 war resumed, leading to the Battle of Callinicum.
