= Phazas the Iberian =

Phazas (Georgian: ფაზა, romanized: paza; Greek: Φάζας) was a Chosroid prince of the Kingdom of Iberia and a cavalry officer in the Roman (Byzantine) service during the Gothic War (535–554). He was a nephew of Peranius and cousin of Pacurius.

In 542, he commanded an Armenian force sent with Maximinus by sea from Constantinople to Italy. The expedition was delayed at Syracuse whence Phazas was sent to assist Naples, besieged by the Goths; a storm drove the Roman ships ashore close to the Gothic camp. Many were killed or captured, but Phazas and Herodianus, commander of the Thracian corps, with a few others escaped. In late 547, Phazas accompanied Belisarius to Tarentum and, together with Barbation, was entrusted with the duty to guard the passes around Crotone where he clashed with the cavalry of the Ostrogoth king Totila. His force was annihilated and Phazas himself was killed in action.
