= George Philip Baker =

George Philip Baker (Plumstead, 21 May 1879 – 19 April 1951) was a British author, who published several popular history books in the 1920s and 1930s.

== Life ==
As Baker was deaf from eight years old, he couldn't serve in the English army, but he would serve almost all of his adult life as a civil servant in the Royal Artillery. He had an interest for military history and would stress the importance of political and economical developments as underlying causes for the military capacities that would cause the rise and fall of empires. Although he wasn't a professional scholar, he always read the contemporary scientific literature in order to be well informed to talk about his subject. He wrote books about several historical figures (Sulla, Hannibal, Tiberius, Constantine the Great, Justinian I, Charlemagne, the warrior kings of Wessex), as well as a book on decisive battles that would be reprinted several times (A Book of Battles, 1935.). In his books he paid attention to military tactics and strategies.

== Works ==
- Sulla the fortunate: the great dictator; being an essay on politics in the form of a historical biography, New York, 1927.
- Tiberius Cæsar, New York, 1928.
- Hannibal, New York, 1929.
- Constantine the Great and the Christian revolution, New York, 1930.
- The fighting kings of Wessex: a gallery of portraits, New York, 1931.
- Justinian, New York, 1931.
- Charlemagne, and the united states of Europe, New York, 1932.
- Twelve centuries of Rome: 753 B.C. - A.D. 476, London, 1934.
- A book of battles; being a description of fifteen battles that determined the course of civilization, together with some account of the men who fought them and the women who influenced them, New York, 1935.
- Augustus: the Golden Age of Rome, New York, 1937.
