= SS Iberia =

SS Iberia may refer to several ships, including:

- SS Iberia (1833)
- SS Iberia (1873), a steamship
- SS Iberia (1954), an ocean liner
