= Sunicas =

Sunicas (Greek: Σουνίκας) was a Hun who served in the Byzantine military during the Iberian War, in the early reign of Emperor Justinian I (r. 527–565).

== Biography ==
According to Zacharias of Mytilene, Sunicas was a Hun who fled to the Byzantine Empire, where he was baptized. By 527, he was an officer stationed at the fortress of Dara in Mesopotamia along with Simmas, and defended it against Sassanid Persian attacks. In 530, he appears as a dux, although it is not clear whether he held the territorial command of dux Mesopotamiae or if he just received the title. In this capacity, he participated at the great Byzantine victory in the Battle of Dara in June 530, where, along with Aigan, he commanded a 600-strong unit of Hun cavalry stationed on the Byzantine left flank. During the battle, Sunicas's Huns repelled the Persian attack on the Byzantine left and were then sent by Belisarius, the Byzantine commander, to reinforce the threatened right flank. There, Sunicas killed the Persian second-in-command, Baresmanes, as well as his standard-bearer, and the Sassanid Persians began to fall back in panic, cementing the Byzantine victory.

In the next year, he served again under Belisarius in his new campaign against Sassanid Persia. On his own initiative, he led a force into the Persian rear, where he caught many Persians and their Arab allies out foraging. He killed some of them and captured others for interrogation. However, as he had acted without orders, Belisarius severely reprimanded him, and only through the mediation of Belisarius's co-commander Hermogenes were the two reconciled. At the Battle of Callinicum (April 19, 531), Sunicas and Simmas were placed in command of the Byzantine left. Although they repelled the successive Persian attacks, the remainder of the army was defeated and forced to withdraw. Sunicas and his men, mostly infantry, nevertheless continued to fight, preventing the Sassanid Persians from pursuing the defeated Byzantines. Nothing is known of him thereafter.

== Sources ==
- Greatrex, Geoffrey; Lieu, Samuel N. C. (2002). The Roman Eastern Frontier and the Persian Wars (Part II, 363–630 AD). London, United Kingdom: Routledge. ISBN 0-415-14687-9.
- Martindale, John R., ed. (1992). The Prosopography of the Later Roman Empire: Volume III, AD 527–641. Cambridge: Cambridge University Press. ISBN 0-521-20160-8.
