= Pharas the Herulian =

Pharas the Herulian (also known as "Varus") was a sixth-century commander of Herulian forces loyal to the Eastern Roman Empire (Byzantium), who figures briefly in Procopius’ narrative of Justinian's wars.

Edward Gibbon notes, in his History of the Decline and Fall of the Roman Empire, that Pharas was an officer noted for his "truth and sobriety".

== Commander against the Persians at Dara ==
In 530, Procopius related, Pharas and his forces supported Rome at Dara against a Persian invasion against The Eastern Roman Empire (526-530). There he led 300 Heruli initially as defenders against Persian infantry and cavalry, and then in a hidden flanking attack against the Persian rearguard.

== Interception and capture of the Vandal King Gelimer ==
In 533-34, Pharas intercepted the Vandal King Gelimer, who was attempting to flee Africa for Spain after suffering defeat at the Battle of Tricamarum. Pharas blockaded Gelimer for three months in the Pappuan mountains of northern Africa. Pharas wrote to Gelimer and asked him to surrender, guaranteeing that he would be treated well by the Emperor Justinian.

According to Gibbon's translation of Procopius, Varas wrote “Like yourself, I am an illiterate Barbarian, but I speak the language of plain sense and an honest heart. Why will you persist in hopeless obstinacy? Why will you ruin yourself, your family, and nation? The love of freedom and abhorrence of slavery? Alas! my dearest Gelimer, are you not already the worst of slaves, the slave of the vile nation of the Moors? Would it not be preferable to sustain at Constantinople a life of poverty and servitude, rather than to reign the undoubted monarch of the mountain of Papua? Do you think it a disgrace to be the subject of Justinian? Belisarius is his subject; and we ourselves, whose birth is not inferior to your own, are not ashamed of our obedience to the Roman emperor. That generous prince will grant you a rich inheritance of lands, a place in the senate, and the dignity of Patrician: such are his gracious intentions, and you may depend with full assurance on the word of Belisarius. So long as heaven has condemned us to suffer, patience is a virtue; but, if we reject the proffered deliverance, it degenerates into blind and stupid despair.”

Gelimer initially refused but later surrendered to General Belisarius, who had pursued him from the Battle of Tricamaron, and joined Pharas.
