= Cadiseni =

Ancient tribe of Hephtalites that lived in Garchistan

The Cadiseni were a tribe mentioned by the Roman historian Procopius fighting against the Sassanian Empire in the 5th century.
