= Pacurius the Iberian =

Pacurius (Georgian: ბაკურ, romanized: bak'ur) was a Chosroid prince of the Kingdom of Iberia (Kartli, eastern Georgia), and a military commander in the Roman service in Italy.

== Name ==
His name is presumably a Latinized rendition of the Georgian Bakur, being a form of the Greek Bakour (Πακώρος), itself a variant of the Middle Iranian Pakur, derived from Old Iranian bag-puhr ('son of a god'). The name "Bakur" is the Georgian (ბაკურ) and Armenian (Բակուր) attestation of Middle Iranian Pakur.

== Life ==
Pacurius was a son of Peranius and cousin of Phazas. He served as a general under the emperor Justinian I. During the Gothic War (535–554), he was sent, together with Sergius, to reinforce Belisarius in Calabria in 547. In 552, he commanded the Roman troops in Hydruntum and negotiated the surrender of Tarentum and Acherontia and their Gothic commandants Ragnaris and Moras. When Ragnaris attempted to outplay the Romans and took fifty of their soldiers hostage, Pacurius marched against him and won a decisive victory.
