= Battle of Dara =

Battle of the Iberian War, 530 AD

Coordinates: 37.1800°N 40.9550°E

- Part of the Iberian War
- Map of Middle East displaying the borders between the Byzantine (Roman) and Sasanian Empires
Date	June 530 AD
Location	Dara (also known as Anastasioupolis), Mardin Province, Turkey
Result	Byzantine victory

Belligerents
Byzantine Empire; Heruli; Huns	Sasanian Empire

Commanders and leaders
Belisarius; Hermogenes; Pharas; John son of Nicetas; Sunicas; Aigan; Simmas; Ascan	Perozes; Pityaxes; Baresmanas †

Strength
25,000 men	50,000 men; (40,000 men before reinforcements)

Casualties and losses
Less than 5,000 men	8,000+ men

The Battle of Dara was fought between the Byzantine Empire and the Sasanian Empire in June 530 AD during the Iberian War.

Following the collapse of diplomatic efforts between the Byzantine Emperor Justinian I and Shah Kavadh I, a Sasanian army advanced on the fortified city of Dara, where it was met by a smaller Byzantine force commanded by Belisarius. Despite being outnumbered, Belisarius prepared a defensive position outside the fort's walls, using trenches to protect the infantry and control the locations of engagements to offset the Sasanian numerical advantage. After two days of skirmishing and unsuccessful negotiations, the main battle ended in a Byzantine victory. Disciplined cavalry deployments on the flanks, combined with coordinated counterattacks, shattered the Sasanian wings and triggered a Sasanian rout.

Despite the defeat, the Sasanians resumed offensive operations the following year, culminating in the Byzantine defeat at the Battle of Callinicum. The Perpetual Peace treaty was signed in the summer of 532, where the Byzantines paid tribute to the Sasanians, in exchange for a peace of indefinite duration. Justinian was likely preoccupied with affairs in the West, while Khosrow wanted to shift his attention towards internal affairs, leading to both leaders seeking for a resolution to the conflict.

== Background ==
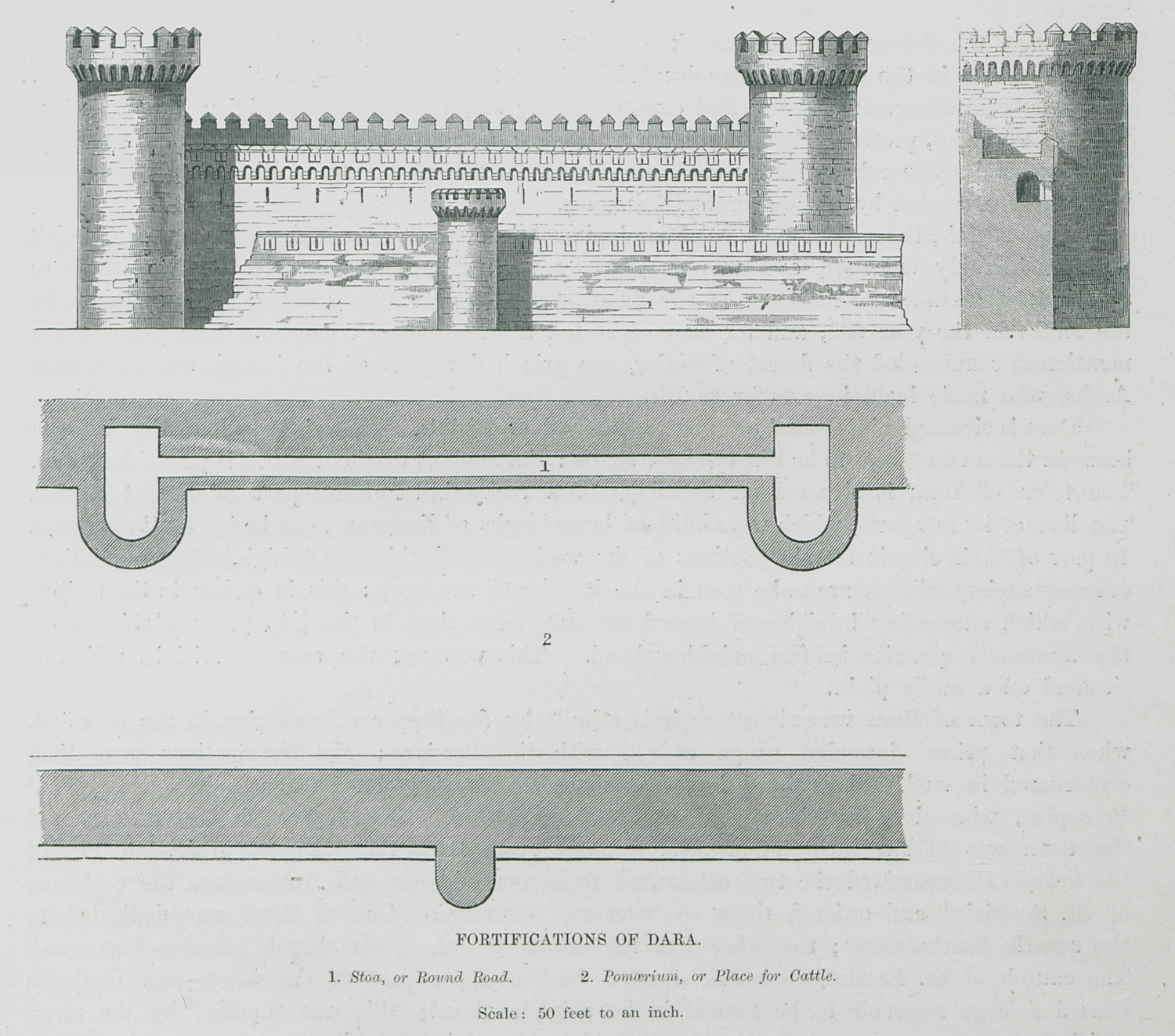
Architectural drawing of the fortifications of Dara by Charles Texier in 1864

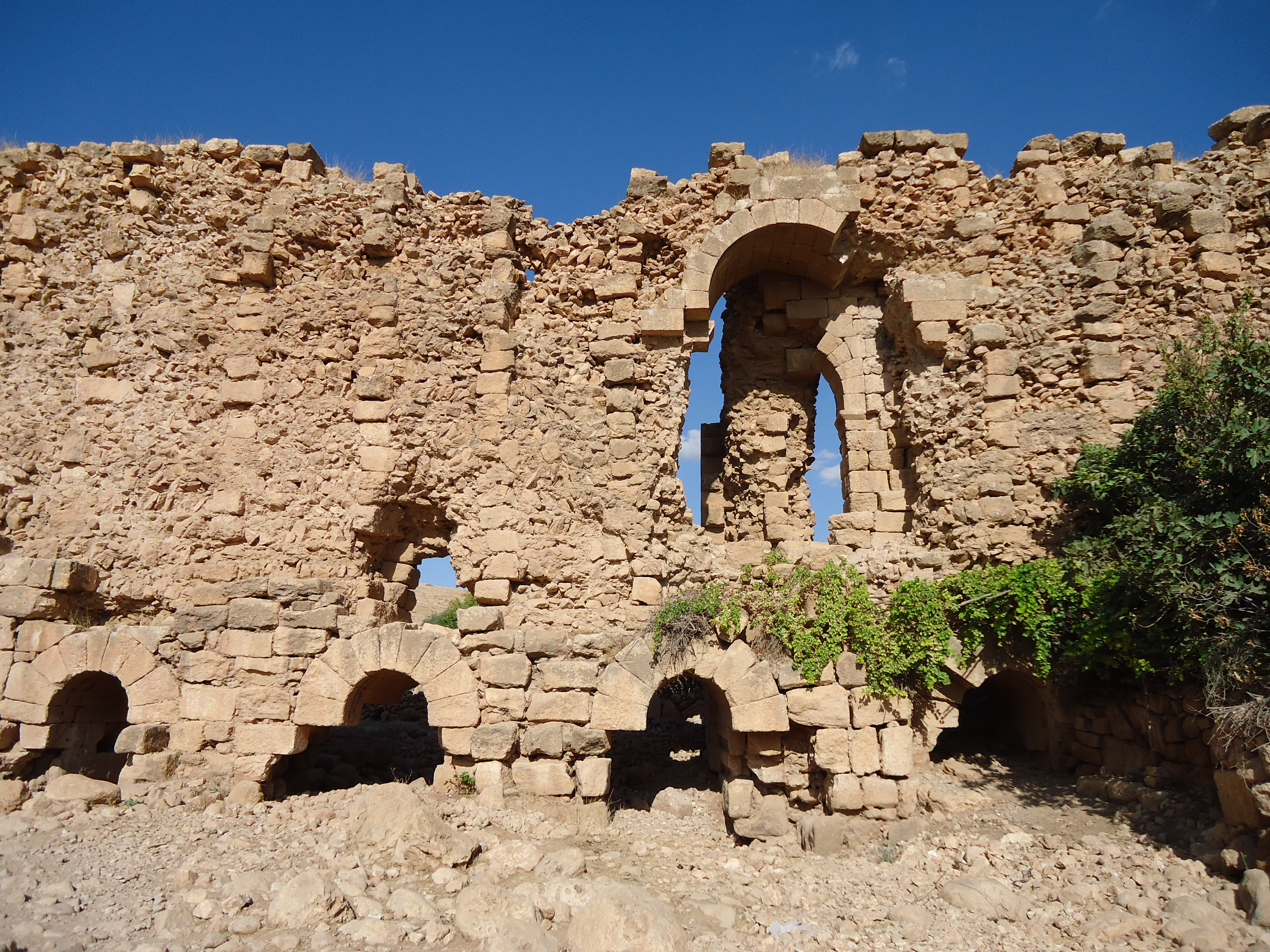
Ruins of Justinian's fortifications at Dara

The Byzantine Empire was at war with the Sasanian Empire from 527 because Kavadh I had tried to force the Iberians to become Zoroastrian. The Iberian king fled from Kavadh, but Kavadh tried to make peace with the Byzantines, and attempted to have Justin I adopt his son Khosrau. Justin agreed, but on the condition that he would do so only in a rite reserved for barbarians. This failed to satisfy Kavadh, who attacked Byzantine allies; Justin sent his generals Sittas and Belisarius into Persia, where they suffered early defeat.

In 529, the failed negotiations of Justin's successor Justinian prompted him to create leverage over the Sasanians to force a peace treaty. Justinian sought to reinforce the border cities of Dara (known at the time as Anastasioupolis) and Nisibis, but this triggered a Sasanian expedition towards Dara the following year. Belisarius was sent back to the region with an army alongside the magister officiorum Hermogenes. The presence of Hermogenes was to ensure that the other Byzantine commanders obeyed Belisarius's orders, who had recently been promoted to magister militum per Orientem. The approximately 25-year-old Belisarius was leading his first campaign as a senior commander. Kavadh sent an army of 40,000 men under the general Perozes, who set up camp at Ammodius, 7.7 kilometres (4.8 mi) south of Dara. Before the battle, Perozes sent a message to Belisarius to prepare a bath for his arrival, which Belisarius ignored.

== Deployment ==
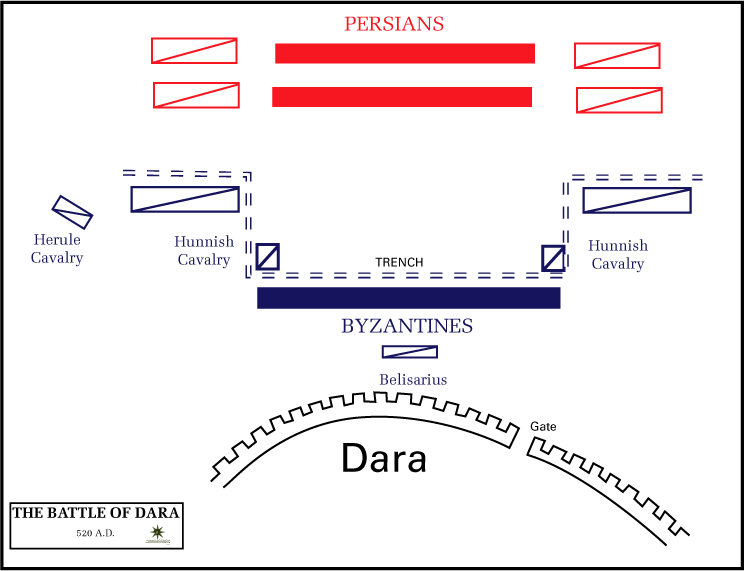
Map displaying the deployment of the Byzantine and Sasanian armies and the defensive trenches near the walls of Dara

The Sasanians deployed around 20 stades (Note: 20 stades is approximately 4.5 kilometres (2.8 mi).) away from the fortress of Dara and drew up their battle lines. Despite being significantly outnumbered, Belisarius chose not to retreat behind the fort's walls, preferring to have the initiative. (Note: Another plausible reason was that 25,000 troops were too many to feed during a siege, but sufficient to meet the Sasanians in battle.) The Byzantines prepared a defensive position, believing that much of the Sasanian army consisted of poorly equipped and ineffective conscript infantry. The Byzantines dug a number of ditches to block the Sasanian cavalry, leaving gaps between them to allow a counterattack. According to Irfan Shahid, the tactic was adopted from the Sasanians at the Battle of Thannuris two years earlier. These were pushed forward on either flank of his position, while his center was held back. Here he placed his infantry behind the central ditch, presumably close enough to the walls of the fortress to provide supporting fire from the city battlements. On the left and right flanks were the Byzantine cavalry. Supporting them on their interior flanks were small bodies of Huns: 300 Hun cavalry under Sunicas and Aigan supporting the left; the Byzantine right mirrored this arrangement under John son of Nicetas, and by Cyril and Marcellus. At the right angle of the trench, there was another cavalry detachment under Simmas and Ascan with orders to attack the flanks of Sasanians in case the right wing cavalry retreated. Belisarius also placed a body of Heruli cavalry under Pharas in ambush position off his left flank. Belisarius, along with a reserve composed of his own bucellarii household cavalry, was held behind the infantry.

The Sasanian army was deployed in two lines, with the second positioned some distance behind the first. The centre was commanded by the Sasanian general Firuz, while Baresmanes led the left wing and Pityaxes commanded the right.

== Battle ==
On the first day, the battle opened with a cavalry assault by the Sasanian right against the forces of Bouzes, prompting the Roman troops to withdraw as the Sasanians advanced. Concerned that the Hunnic units in the Byzantine center might strike their exposed flank, the Sasanian cavalry halted. Bouzes then ordered a counterattack, forcing the Sasanians to retreat, losing seven men during their withdrawal.

According to contemporary historian and witness Procopius of Caesarea, two challenges for single combat took place. A Sasanian soldier rode forward to challenge the Byzantines to single combat. Rather than being answered by a regular soldier, the challenge was accepted by Andreas, a member of Bouzes's retinue who served as his attendant and was a professional wrestler. Andreas swiftly unhorsed and killed his opponent, providing a boost to Byzantine morale. In response, a second experienced Sasanian warrior issued the same challenge. Despite orders of non-engagement from Hermogenes, Andreas accepted the challenge. After both combatants initially unhorsed one another, Andreas once more emerged victorious. The Byzantines, both on the walls and in the battle lines, raised a shout. The successive defeats appear to have demoralized the Sasanian army, and with dusk approaching, the Sasanians withdrew to their camp at Ammodius. The historian, Connor Whately, argues that Procopius's description was intended to be a narrative device, foreshadowing the evolution of the battle, rather than a factual account. Another source, believed to be based on official documents, does indeed reference individual combat, but makes no mention of Andreas and places any single combat engagements at a different stage of the battle.

On the second day there were no engagements, but the two leaders exchanged letters. Belisarius sent a letter to Perozes, arguing that it was best to avoid conflict and to settle their disputes by discussion. The letter read, "The first blessing is peace, as is agreed by all men who have even a small share of reason. ... The best general, therefore, is that one which is able to bring about peace from war." The negotiations failed. The Sasanians thought the Byzantine army was inferior and of low morale following its recent defeats. The letter, along with his numerical superiority, likely made Perozes even more confident of victory.

On the following day, 10,000 Sasanian reinforcements arrived from Nisibis. The Sassanid and Byzantine armies exchanged arrow fire, resulting in minor casualties on each side. Although the Sasanians had numerical superiority, strong winds weakened their volleys, limiting their impact. Belisarius secretly positioned a small cavalry force behind a hill on the Byzantine left, ready to strike the Sasanian flank from the rear. Around midday, the Sasanians launched a full assault, their right wing initially pushed back the Byzantine forces under Bouzes. (Note: At this time of the day the temperature of the region has been estimated to have been particularly hot, probably around 45 °C (113 °F).) At the critical moment, Hunnic cavalry and Belisarius's hidden troops attacked from both sides, trapping the Sasanian cavalry and forcing them into retreat. Around 3,000 Sasanian horsemen were killed. After a brief pause, the Sasanian commander Firuz shifted his main attack to the Byzantine right, reinforced by the elite Immortals. The assault drove back the Byzantine cavalry under John, but Belisarius quickly sent infantry, cavalry, and Hunnic reinforcements. Their counterattack split the Sasanian line in two, isolating one section from the rest of the army. As confusion spread, the Sasanian commander Baresmanes was killed, and the Immortals began to collapse. Byzantine forces under John regrouped and attacked the Sasanian left from the rear, turning the battle decisively in Byzantine favor. About 5,000 Sasanians were killed in the final fighting, and the Sasanian army broke into a rout. Belisarius allowed pursuit for a few miles before recalling his troops to prevent them from overextending and risking a Sasanian counterattack.

== Aftermath ==
Following the defeat, the Sasanians under Spahbod Azarethes together with their client Lakhmids started another invasion, this time, unexpectedly, via Commagene. Belisarius foiled their plan by swift maneuvering and forced the Sasanians, who were retreating, into a Battle of Callinicum in which the Byzantines were defeated, but with severe casualties on both sides. The mutual disaster of Callinicum ended the first of Justinian's series of relatively unsuccessful and inconclusive wars against the Sassanids, leading Byzantium to pay tribute in exchange for the Perpetual Peace treaty, which was signed in the summer of 532.
