= Silentiarius =

Court title of the Byzantine Empire

Silentiarius, Hellenized to silentiarios (Greek: σιλεντιάριος) and Anglicized to silentiary, was the Latin title given to a class of courtiers in the Byzantine imperial court, responsible for order and silence (Latin: silentium) in the Great Palace of Constantinople. In the middle Byzantine period (8th–11th centuries), it was transformed into an honorific court title.

== History and functions ==
An imperial edict dated to 326 or 328 provides the earliest attestation of the title. The schola of the silentiarii was supervised by the praepositus sacri cubiculi and its members belonged to the jurisdiction of the magister officiorum. Their function in the palace was to keep order during imperial audiences and to call the meeting of the emperor's privy council, the consistorium (an act called "silentium nuntiare"). Four silentiarii were detailed to the service of the empress. The silentiarii were chosen from the senatorial class, but freed from the usual obligations of this class. A class of honorary silentiarii, admittance into which could be purchased, also existed. By 437, the size of the actual schola had been set to thirty, with three decuriones (Greek: δεκουρίωνες) placed in charge of it. Although initially low-ranking, their proximity to the imperial person occasioned the elevation of the ordinary members to the rank of vir spectabilis in the 5th century and of the decuriones further to the rank of vir illustris in the 6th century.

After the 6th century, the post became purely ceremonial. The title survived into the lists of offices of the 9th and 10th centuries as the second-lowest among the honorific dignities reserved for the "bearded men" (i.e. non-eunuchs). According to the Klētorologion of Philotheos, their distinctive badge of office was a gold staff. Peter the Patrician records how the emperor himself would conduct the ceremony of their investiture with the staff. The last attested occurrence of the title is during the reign of Emperor Nikephoros II Phokas (r. 963–969), and like most of the middle Byzantine titles, it seems to have disappeared sometime in the 11th–12th centuries.

== Notable silentiarii ==
- Emperor Anastasius I (r. 491–518) was a decurio of the silentiarii before his accession to the throne.
- Paul the Silentiary, 6th-century poet in the court of Emperor Justinian I (r. 527–565).
- Gubazes II, client king of Lazica (r. 541–554), by birth a half-Roman, served as a silentiarius at the time of his accession.
- John the Silentiary, in 751, attempted with Pope Stephen II to negotiate the release of some territories seized by the Lombard King Aistulf.

== Sources ==
- Bury, J. B. (1911). The Imperial Administrative System of the Ninth Century – With a Revised Text of the Kletorologion of Philotheos. London: Oxford University Press. OCLC 1046639111.
- Kazhdan, Alexander (1991). "Silentiarios". In Kazhdan, Alexander (ed.). The Oxford Dictionary of Byzantium. Oxford and New York: Oxford University Press. p. 1896. ISBN 0-19-504652-8.
