= Dorotheus (magister militum) =

Dorotheus (Greek: Δωρόθεος) was a Byzantine military commander. While being magister militum per Armeniam he won a battle against the Persians, in 530, as well as taking part in the Battle of Satala. At Satala he defended the city while his superior Sittas was hidden with some cavalry in the nearby area and attacked the Persians in the rear, routing their 30,000 with the Byzantine 15,000. He defeated the Persians again in 531 and later drove the Sabir Huns out through the Caucasus. He was sent to North Africa with Belisarius, but died on the way, which caused mourning throughout the army.
