= Peranius the Iberian =

Peranius (Georgian: პერანი, romanized: p'erani; Greek: Περάνιος) was a Georgian prince from Iberia and a military commander in Roman (Byzantine) service. According to Procopius, he was the eldest son of the Iberian king Gurgenes. Gurgenes can be identified with Vakhtang I of Iberia of the Georgian sources; and Peranius might have been his brother rather than a son as suggested by Procopius. He was the father of Pacurius and uncle of Phazas, two other Iberian generals of the Roman army. According to Cyril Toumanoff, he may have been a scion of King Sauromaces II of Iberia.

Peranius and his family fled the Sassanid oppression of Iberia into Lazica in the 520s. They placed themselves under Roman protection and left for Constantinople where Peranius joined the Byzantine imperial army. Later in the 530s, he served under Belisarius in Italy and was in Rome during the siege by the Goths (537–538). During the siege, he defended the Porta Praenestina and led a sally from the Porta Salaria. In mid-538, he laid a siege to Urbs Vetus (Orvieto) which fell in early 539.

Early in the 540s, Peranius was transferred to the eastern frontier where he fought the Sassanid Persian armies. He raided Taraunitis in 543 while the main Roman army invaded Persian Armenia. and was one of the Roman commanders defending Edessa in 544. The Persian king Khosrow I (r. 531–579), demanded the surrender of Peranius and Peter on the grounds that they were his hereditary slave. When a Sassanid contingent under Azarethes threatened to break into the city through one of the gates, Peranius led reinforcements of soldiers and citizens to the spot and averted the danger.

Soon after the end of the siege of Edessa, Peranius died of severe injuries sustained in a fall from his horse while hunting.

== Sources ==
- Martindale, John Robert; Jones, Arnold Hugh Martin; Morris, J., eds. (1992). The Prosopography of the Later Roman Empire, Volume III: A.D. 527–641. Cambridge, United Kingdom: Cambridge University Press. ISBN 978-0-521-20160-5.
