= Sittas =

Byzantine general (died 538)

- Died: 538
- Military career
- Allegiance: Byzantine Empire
- Rank: magister militum
- Nickname: The military person of Byzantine Empire
- Conflicts: Iberian War : Battle of Satala

Sittas (Greek: Σίττας; died 538) was a Byzantine military commander during the reign of Emperor Justinian I (r. 527–565). During the Iberian War against the Sassanid Empire, Sittas was given command of forces in Armenia, similar to the status of Belisarius in Mesopotamia. He won a victory over the Sassanids at the battle of Satala.

== Biography ==
Sittas was the husband of Comito, the elder sister of the Empress Theodora, and possible father of the later empress Sophia.

Sittas's origin is obscure. Byzantinists have suggested his name was Gothic or Thracian, but his theoretical descent from either the Goths or the Thracians is not mentioned in primary sources. He enters history in the reign of Emperor Justin I (r. 518–527) as a doryphoros ("bodyguard") in the guard of Justinian, then magister militum per Orientem.

Map of the Byzantine-Persian frontier

In 527, Sittas and Belisarius were given command of an invasion of Persarmenia. They were successful in looting the area and capturing a significant number of Armenian prisoners. They attempted to invade the rest of the Marzpanate of Armenia later in the year but were defeated by Aratius and Narses. The latter should not be confused with Narses, another Byzantine general under Emperor Justinian.

In 528, Sittas was appointed in the new office of magister militum per Armeniam. According to both Malalas and Theophanes the Confessor, Sittas recruited his scriniarii (administrative officials) among the local Armenian populace, as he considered them more familiar with the territory. Procopius records Sittas's victory over the Tzanni, a tribe of the Caucasus, which led occasional raids in neighbouring areas. Sittas successfully converted them from Paganism to Christianity and recruited the former brigands to the Byzantine army.

In 530, Sittas also received the office of magister militum praesentalis ("Master of soldiers in the Presence [of the Emperor]"). That same year, Sittas and Dorotheus defended Theodosiopolis against an invading force from the Sassanid Empire, part of the ongoing Iberian War between Emperor Justinian and the Persian shah, Kavadh I (r. 488–531). Procopius notes that the Roman forces managed to pillage the enemy camp. Sittas also defended Satala against the invasion force by attacking the larger army at its rear and forcing them to retreat (Battle of Satala). The invasion was called off and the Sassanids retreated back to Persia following the two defeats.

Following the defeat of Belisarius in the Battle of Callinicum (19 April 531), Sittas replaced him in the leadership of the forces in the east. During the Siege of Martyropolis (531), Sittas and Al-Harith ibn Jabalah camped at the nearby city of Amida, but avoided engagement as the Persians had the upper hand there. Kavadh, however, died within the year, and his son and successor Khosrau I (r. 531–579 AD) was interested in stabilizing his internal position for the time being and started negotiations for a peace. The "Eternal Peace" agreement (which eventually lasted ten years) was signed on September 532 on the terms of all Byzantine land lost under Emperor Justinian's rule to be returned, and the Byzantines to pay heavy tribute in exchange for peace. The country of Iberia remained under Sassanid control.

Sittas received the honorific title of patrician in 535. The same year, Sittas is credited with a victory against the Bulgars in Moesia, by the Iatrus (Yantra). He was named an honorary consul in 536. In 538/539, Sittas was sent back to Armenia to face a revolt in protest against heavy taxation. Failing to negotiate peace, Sittas started active fighting. In the Battle of Oenochalcon, the nature of the terrain forced both armies to fight in scattered groups rather than in unified forces. Procopius records that Sittas was killed by either Artabanes, a leader of the revolt, or Solomon, an otherwise obscure rebel.

== Sources ==
- Martindale, John R., ed. (1992). The Prosopography of the Later Roman Empire: Volume III, AD 527–641. Cambridge: Cambridge University Press. ISBN 0-521-20160-8.
