= Perozes =

Sasanian Persian general

- Military career
- Allegiance: Sasanian Empire
- Branch: Sasanian army
- Rank: Astabadh?
- Conflicts: Iberian War: Battle of Dara; Battle of Thannuris

Perozes (Greek: Περόζης, from Middle Persian Pērōz) was the Sasanian Persian general opposing the Byzantines under Belisarius at the Battle of Dara (530).

According to the description of the Byzantine historian Procopius of Caesarea, he was "a Persian, whose title was "mirranes" (for thus the Persians designate this office), Perozes by name". Mirranes (Μιρράνης) however probably refers not to an office, but to the House of Mihran, one of the seven great noble clans of the Sasanian Empire. After his defeat at Dara, he was disgraced by the Persian shah Kavadh I. Nothing else is known of his life. He may however be identical to the mirranes who according to Procopius tried to lay siege to Dara during the Anastasian War.

== Sources ==
- Martindale, John R., ed. (1992). The Prosopography of the Later Roman Empire: Volume III, AD 527–641. Cambridge: Cambridge University Press. ISBN 0-521-20160-8.
