= Battle of Callinicum =

Battle of the Iberian War (531 AD)

Coordinates: 35.9500°N 39.0167°E

- Part of the Iberian War
- Byzantine-Persian frontier in the 4th to 7th centuries
| Date | 19 April 531 |
| Location | Callinicum, Syria, Byzantine Empire (modern Raqqa, northern Syria) |
| Result | Sasanian victory (see Aftermath) |

Belligerents
| Byzantine Empire; Ghassanids | Sasanian Empire; Lakhmids |

Commanders and leaders
| Belisarius; Hermogenes; Sunicas; Simmas; Ascan †; Longinus †; Stephanacius † | Azarethes; Al-Mundhir III ibn al-Nu'man |

Strength
| 20,000 | 20,000–30,000 |

The Battle of Callinicum took place on Easter Saturday, 19 April 531, between the Byzantine Empire and Sasanian Empire during the Iberian War.

Following the Persian defeat at the Battle of Dara, the Persian army, under the command of Azarethes, invaded Syria and advanced toward Antioch by taking a different route in an attempt to regain the initiative in the war. The invasion caught the Byzantines off guard, but General Belisarius pursued the Persians with a smaller force, accompanied by allied Ghassanids, to block their advance. His army was subsequently strengthened by reinforcements. Belisarius was reluctant to engage the Persians due to the quality of his troops and instead aimed to drive the Persians off the Byzantine territories through demonstration of force. However, his troops insisted on giving battle, and the two armies met near Callinicum on Easter Sunday at the right bank of the Euphrates River. At the battle, the Byzantines were defeated after their allied Ghassanid cavalry was routed. The remaining infantry held off the Persian forces long enough to withdraw across the river.

Although the Persians won the battle, heavy casualties and their failure to capture Antioch made the victory costly. Upon his return to Persia, Azarethes was consequently disgraced by King Kavadh I. An inquiry into the Byzantine side cleared Belisarius of any wrongdoing, but he was relieved of command and recalled to Constantinople. The battle was the final major field engagement of the first phase of Justinian I's war against the Sasanian Empire, which concluded the following year with the Perpetual Peace of 532.

== Prelude ==
The Iberian War was a conflict between the Byzantine Empire under Emperor Justinian I and the Sasanian Empire under King Kavadh I, driven to influence the Kingdom of Iberia near the Caucasus. The war began after the Iberian king rebelled against Persian rule and sought Byzantine support. Fighting took place across regions of Armenia and Mesopotamia. Initially, the Persians had the upper hand with the victory in the Battle of Thannuris. However, subsequent Persian attempts to break through the Byzantine fortified settlements were unsuccessful, allowing the Byzantines to equalize after the battles at Dara and Satala.

In April 531, Kavadh, to press for an advantage, sent an army under Azarethes, consisting of a cavalry force numbering about 15,000 Aswaran with an additional 5,000 Lakhmid Arab cavalry under Al-Mundhir, to invade Syria. The total number of the Persian army was approximately 20,000–30,000. Azarethes did not take the usual route, which was through the heavily fortified frontier cities of Roman Mesopotamia, but through the less conventional but also less-defended route in Commagene in order to capture Syrian cities such as Antioch.

The Persian army crossed the frontier at Circesium on the Euphrates and marched north. The Persians' route took the Byzantines by surprise because it was the first time the Persians had used this direction to attack. Belisarius acted quickly; he left the majority of his army to defend Dara in case this was a diversion, and Belisarius set out to follow them as they advanced westwards, toward Callinicum. Belisarius's forces consisted of about 5,000 men and another 3,000 Ghassanid Arab allies. The arrival of Belisarius blocked the Persian advance at Chalcis. Despite Belisarius's orders, Hun captain Sunicas's forces raided the Persian army near Gabbulon; from captured prisoners, he learned that the Persians intended to attack Antioch. At Hierapolis, reinforcements under Hermogenes, who arrived from Constantinople, joined with Belisarius's forces, bringing the Byzantine force to approximately 20,000 men. Despite the disagreement between Belisarius and his captain, Hermogenes had the authority, as Magister Officiorum, to force the two men to cooperate. Belisarius and Hermogenes were inclined to allow the Persian retreat through demonstration of force. Belisarius did not consider his troops of appropriate quality and composition to face the Persian army. However, the local commanders sought an engagement because they were motivated by the killing of captives by Al-Mundhir when his army ravaged Syria in 529.

In the meantime, the Persian army sacked the fortress Gabbula near Chalcis and other nearby places. The Persians retreated eastward with the booty they had captured. The Byzantines pursued them and were able to overtake them near the right bank of the Euphrates River, opposite the city of Callinicum. The battle took place on Easter Sunday, when the prevailing custom was to fast throughout the day and into the night. As a result, if Belisarius chose to engage the Persians, his troops would have to fight while hungry. Azarethes sent a message to Belisarius urging him to observe the fast out of respect for the Christians and Jews in his army and his own religious soldiers. Belisarius initially agreed and intended to avoid a dangerous confrontation by driving the Persians away without engaging in a battle. However, the Byzantine troops, emboldened by their recent victories at Dara and Satala, insisted on an immediate engagement. Despite his attempts to persuade his men to abandon their demands, the Byzantine troops openly insulted Belisarius, accusing him of cowardice and undermining their morale, with some officers joining in. Fearing a mutiny if he refused, Belisarius prepared his forces for battle.

== Deployment ==
The two armies met outside Callinicum on 19 April 531. Belisarius anchored his left flank on the Euphrates, composed of the Byzantine heavy infantry under the command of the emperor Justinian's bodyguard Petrus. The Byzantine cavalry was stationed in the center, many of whom were cataphracts under the command of Belisarius and Ascan. Next were the Lycaonian and/or Isaurian infantry under Stephanacius and Longinus, positioned so that their right was anchored on a rising slope occupied by the army's right wing, which consisted of the 5,000 allied Ghassanid cavalry. He placed his heavy cavalry in the center and the infantry and allied cavalry on the wings, possibly because he anticipated that the infantry and Ghassanid cavalry could flee.

Azarethes, who was an "exceptionally able warrior" according to Byzantine historian and chronicler Procopius, chose a more conventional deployment by dividing his army into three equal parts: the allied Lakhmid cavalry under Al-Mundhir forming the Sasanian left wing, opposing the Ghassanids, while his own cavalry formed the center and right flank.

== Battle ==
Azarethes reinforces his left wing and the Byzantine right wing is beaten back

The Byzantine center, including the cavalry, is exposed and routed. Infantry led by Petrus delay the Persian advance for some defenders to retreat.

The battle began with an exchange of arrow shots, with Procopius noting the rapidness of the Persian archery. This difference in archery is also mentioned in the Strategikon of Maurice, which advised closing in with the Persians without any delay. This, combined with a westerly wind, caused the Byzantine side to suffer more casualties at this stage. According to historian Ian Hughes, however, the casualties were balanced due to the greater penetrative force of Byzantine archery.

After "two-thirds of the day" had elapsed, Azarethes redeployed some of his cavalry to his left wing; this was a similar tactic used at Dara, where the Persians tried to find a weak spot and overwhelm it by creating local numerical superiority. This redeployment was not observed by Belisarius. The Ghassanids were routed off the field with such ease as to later inspire accusations of treachery. This exposed the right flank of the Lycaonian infantry, who were no match for the Persian cavalry, and they were also routed after their commanders were killed. The right flank of Ascan's heavy cavalry was now exposed; they fought as best they could, but Ascan was killed and his force defeated.

The Persian cavalry and their Lakhmid allies now controlled the rising ground, looking down on the rest of the Byzantine force. As the remainder of the Byzantine cavalry fled and Belisarius was unable to reform his line, the Byzantine infantrymen found themselves pressed against the river. They formed a U-shaped phoulkon (fulcum) formation to defend against the missile attacks by the Persians, with the top of the "U" being closed by the river and foot-archers in the center of the "U" firing arrows at the Persians. They withstood the Persian attacks until nightfall, when they safely escaped across the Euphrates to Callinicum. Apparently, repeated charges by the Persian cavalry against the Byzantine infantry achieved nothing more than increasing casualties on both sides.

The primary sources reporting this phase of the battle are not in agreement. According to Procopius, Belisarius dismounted and fought alongside the infantry until nightfall, while contemporary historian John Malalas reports that Belisarius had fled earlier across the Euphrates in a boat, while his subordinates Sunicas and Simmas dismounted and fought alongside the infantry. Hughes argues this latter scenario is more probable. Procopius's description of the events in this battle is questioned by historians. Both Procopius and Malalas provide a detailed description of the events, but their emphasis is different: Procopius emphasizes Belisarius's success in preventing a complete rout and the Sasanian losses, while Malalas emphasizes Belisarius' early flight from the battlefield, noting that the successful prevention of the rout was led by the doukes Sunicas and Simmas. Both accounts agree on the poor performance of the Lycaonian infantry and possible treachery by the Ghassanids.

== Aftermath ==
Following the battle, an inquiry headed by Constantoilus was made against Belisarius due to the defeat at Callinicum and his earlier loss at Thannuris. Belisarius blamed the troops for their impetuous urge to engage in battle at Callinicum. While he was cleared by the inquiry, he was relieved of his position as magister militum per Orientem and was recalled to Constantinople by Justinian. The Sasanian king Kavadh I was displeased with Azarethes and "ranked him among the most unworthy" due to the heavy Persian losses, small size of the captured booty, and failure to attack Antioch. Despite the outcome of the battle, it was a Pyrrhic victory for the Persians.

The Battle of Callinicum marked the final major field engagement of the first phase of Justinian's campaign against the Sassanids. Negotiations took place as both sides had different motivations for ending the war. Justinian wanted to recover territories of the Western Roman Empire under barbarian rule, and the new Persian king, Khosrow I, needed to secure his claim to the throne. The Perpetual Peace treaty was signed in the summer of 532, in which Byzantium agreed to pay a substantial tribute (11,000 libres of gold).
