= Ajameti Managed Reserve =

Protected nature area in Georgia

- Georgian: აჯამეთის აღკვეთილი
- IUCN category IV (habitat/species management area)
- Ajameti Managed Reserve

- Location within Georgia Location within Imereti
- Interactive map of Ajameti Managed Reserve
- Location: Georgia
- Coordinates: 42°06′48″N 42°45′06″E
- Area: 48.48 km^{2} (18.72 sq mi)
- Established: 2007
- Governing body: Agency of Protected Areas
- Website: Ajameti Managed Reserve

Ajameti Managed Reserve (Georgian: აჯამეთის აღკვეთილი) is a protected area in the Baghdati Municipality, Zestaponi Municipality region of Georgia. It protects famous oaks of Ajameti and other local flora. Some of the trees are from 120 to 200 years old. Reserve also protects local fauna.

== Geography ==
Ajameti Managed Reserve is located 15 km from Kutaisi. It was first founded in 1935. Reserve has two protected areas: Azameti Mukhnari (3742 ha), in the area of Rioni River left tributaries between Kvirila and Khanistskali and Vartsikhe massive (1106 ha), on the left side of Khanistskali.

== Flora ==
4723 hectares of the area is covered by the oak forests, 93 hectares – hornbeam forests and 23 hectares oriental hornbeam (Carpinus orientalis). The forested area of Vartsikhe is included into Ajameti Managed Reserve and was first established in 1946 in order to preserve rare Tertiary era relicts: Imeretian oak (Quercus robur subsp. imeretina) and caucasian elm (Zelkova carpinifolia) trees.

Dendroflora has variety of 60 species. Understory with covered with rhododendron, medlar, sweetbrier and common hawthorn (Crataegus monogyna).

Some species are on the Red List of Georgia: Imeretian oak (Quercus robur subsp. imeretina) and Zelkova or caucasian elm (Zelcova carpinifolia) as well as Pastukhov's ivy (Hedera pastuchovii), Georgian hazelnut (Corylus colchica), wych elm, wingnuts and some others.

== Fauna ==
There are mammals in the Ajameti State Reserve, namely roe deer, foxes, European pine martens (Martes martes), badgers, rabbits, squirrels and dormouse. The forest chicken is also noteworthy.

Among more than 60 species of birds observed in the reserve only 21 are nesting species in local oak forest. All other birds are either migratory birds or have their wintering grounds in reserve.

Amphibians are represented by one species of triton, marsh frog, common frog and green frog. Reptiles are represented by grass snake (Natrix natrix) and dice snake (Natrix tessellata).

Rare and endangered species included into Red List of Georgia: noctule bats, Caucasian squirrel, dormouse, Forest dormouse and Caucasian otter (Lutra lutra meridionalis).

There are also endemic species in protected areas: southern white-breasted hedgehog (Erinaceus concolor), Caucasian mole (Talpa caucasica), Gueldenstaedt's shrew (Crocidura gueldenstaedtii), Mehely's horseshoe bat, (Rhinolophus mehelyi), common bent-wing bat (miniopterus schreibersii), European hare (Lepus europaeus), ordinary squirrel (Sciurus vulgaris) and others.

== See also ==
- Imereti
