= Vartsikhe =

Vartsikhe ვარციხე
- Village
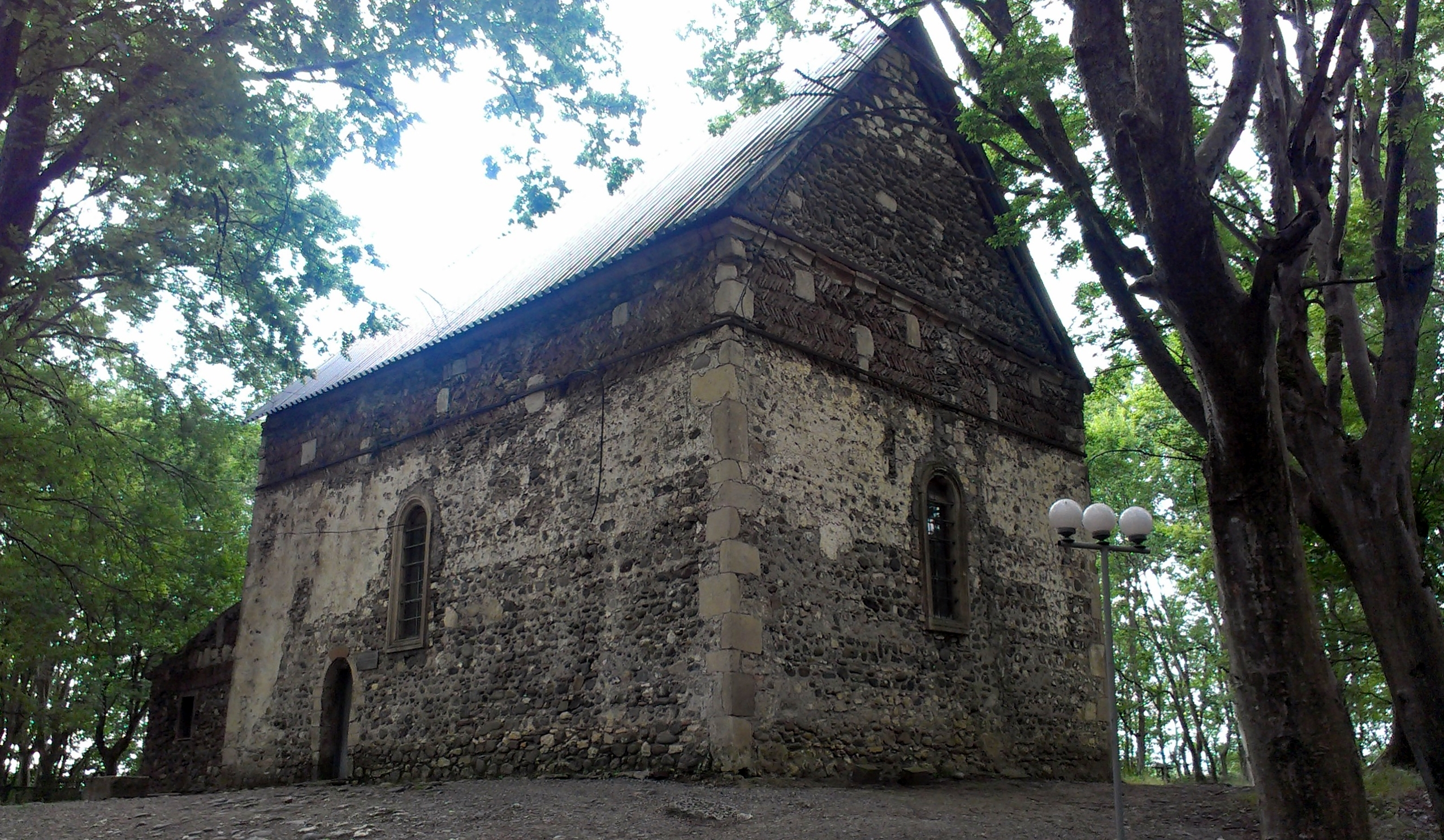
- A 17th-century church in Vartsikhe

- Location of Vartsikhe Vartsikhe (Imereti)
- Coordinates: 42°08′38″N 42°43′04″E
- Country: Georgia
- Region: Imereti
- Municipality: Baghdati
- Elevation: 80 m (260 ft)

Population (2014)
  - Total: 1,559
- Time zone: Georgian Time (UTC+4)

Vartsikhe (Georgian: ვარციხე [väɾt̪͡s̪ʰiχe̞]) is a village in the Baghdati Municipality, Imereti, Georgia. It is located in western part of the country, in the Imereti Lowlands, at the confluence of the Rioni and Khanitskali rivers, some 17 km northwest of the town of Baghdati. Its population as of the 2014 census was 1,559.

Vartsikhe, formerly Vardtsikhe, is the Rhodopolis of the Eastern Roman authors of Late Antiquity. Rhodopolis was one of the key towns in Lazica, contested between the Eastern Roman and Sasanian empires in the 6th century. From the late 15th century into the early 19th, Vardtsikhe functioned as one of the castles of the kings of Imereti.

== History ==
=== Rhodopolis ===
Vartsikhe was home to a fortified settlement, which dates back to the 4th century, as suggested by archaeological evidence. The Georgian name of the village, literally meaning "a fort of the rose", replicates the Greek placename Rhodopolis, "a city of the rose", recorded by the 6th-century Eastern Roman authors such as Procopius and Agathias.

Rhodopolis stood in a fertile and economically advantageous part of Lazica, on the road to its eastern neighbor, Iberia, but the location of the city in an open plain was militarily weak. Therefore, the Lazi, in fear of an invasion by the Sasanian Persian forces, destroyed the fortress of Rhodopolis as incapable of defense in the 530s. During the Lazic War (541–562), the Persian commander Mihr-Mihroe occupied the city and left a garrison in it. In 557, a force of 2,000 cavalrymen placed by the Eastern Roman general Justin under command of a Hun named Elminzur entered Rhodopolis unopposed as both the Persian garrison and locals were outside of the city walls. The Persian detachments were found and destroyed in the neighborhood; the local population were spared, but they had to furnish hostages to prove their loyalty.

Under the Byzantine hegemony, Rhodopolis was a diocese under the metropolis of Phasis. It disappears from the Constantinopolitan Notitiae Episcopatuum in the early 8th century, roughly at the same time as the metropolis of Phasis, due to an Arab invasion of the area. A Greek seal bearing the name of John, Bishop of Rhodopolis, may suggest a short-lived revival of the bishopric in the 11th century. Rhodopolis remains the name of a titular see of both the Greek Orthodox Ecumenical Patriarchate of Constantinople and the Roman Catholic Church. The area of modern-day Vartsikhe falls within the canonical territory of the Eparchy of Vani and Baghdati of the Georgian Orthodox Church.

=== Modern history ===
Recorded history of Vardtsikhe is scarce until the 17th century, when the locale reemerges as a castle owned by the kings of Imereti, who had a summer residence there and enjoyed hunting in the neighboring Ajameti forest. It was refurbished under Alexander V of Imereti (r. 1720–1752). The castle suffered heavily during the Russo-Imeretian operations led by Count Totleben against the Ottoman Empire in 1771. As a conflict between Russia and Imereti was simmering in 1809, King Solomon II left his capital of Kutaisi, garrisoned by a Russian force, and entrenched himself at Vardtsikhe. In an ensuing war, the castle was captured by the Russian troops on 6 March 1810. Imereti was eventually annexed by Russia later that year and the Vardtsikhe castle, already damaged in fighting, fell in disuse. Early in the 1900s, the Ananovs, a family of entrepreneurs from Kutaisi, who owned an estate in Vardtsikhe, built a winery in the village and bottled a local brandy, which is still produced. The Ananov mansion, built in 1860, housed a kindergarten in the Soviet era and then functioned as a hotel.

== Heritage ==
The ruined castle of Vartsikhe is inscribed on the list of the Immovable Monuments of National Significance of Georgia. It was archaeologically studied under the guidance of V. Japaridze in the 1970s. The above-ground fortifications date to the period of the Kingdom of Imereti, while the walls dating from the 4th to the 6th centuries are buried underground. Archaeological material uncovered at Vartsikhe include pottery, glass- and iron-ware. Adjacent territory, especially the Giorgobiani Hill some 200 m south, yielded remains of the settlements of the Late Antiquity.

The forested environs of Vartsikhe are parts of the Ajameti Managed Reserve, originally created in 1946 to preserve rare and relict Imeretian oak and zelkova trees.

== Population ==
As of the 2014 national census, Vartsikhe had a population of 1,559. Most of them (99%) are ethnic Georgians.

Population	2002 census	2014 census
Total	1,942	1,559
