= Justin (consul 540) =

Byzantine aristocrat and general

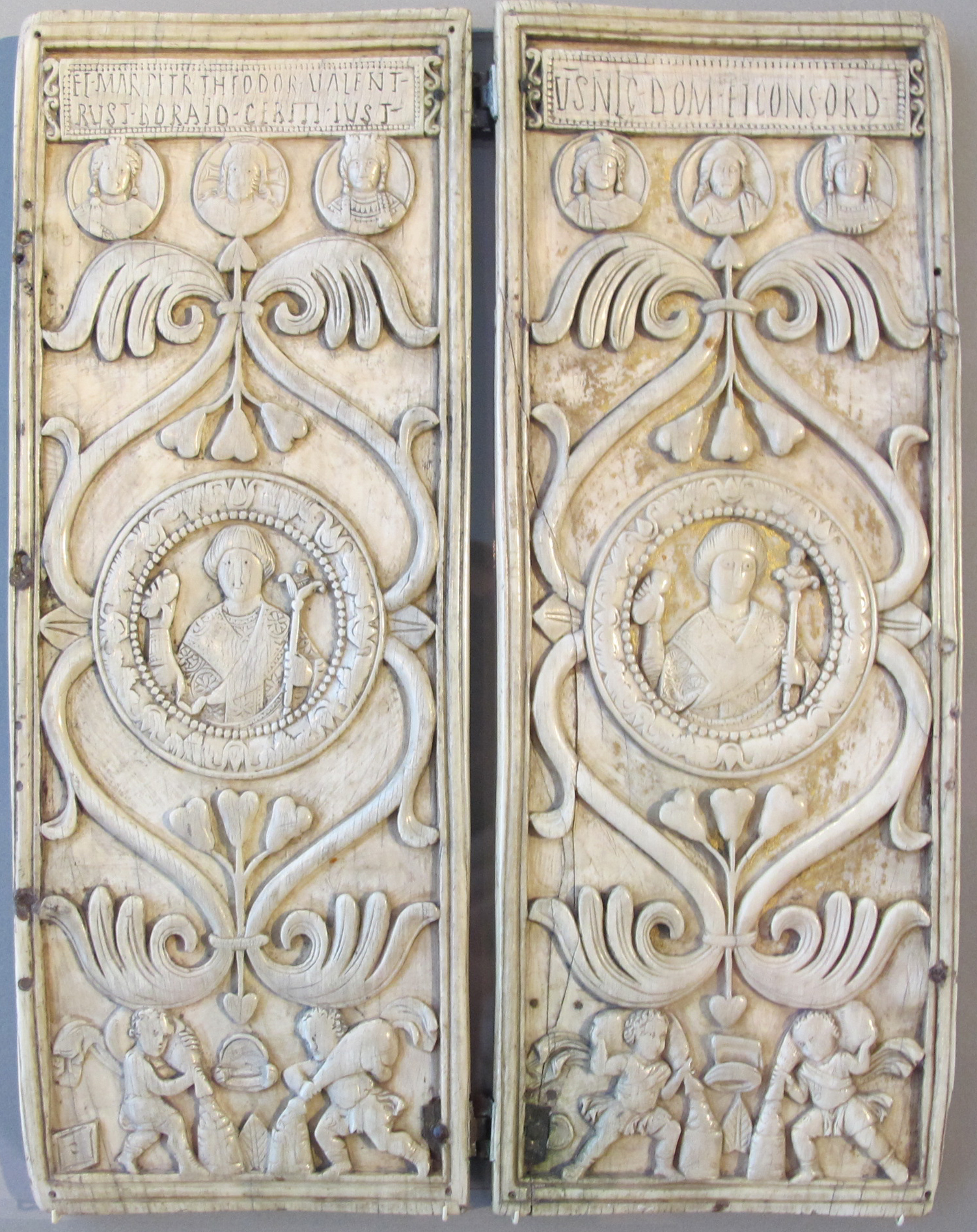
- The ivory consular diptych of Justin, Bode Museum.
- Born: c. 525; Constantinople (modern-day Istanbul, Turkey)
- Died: 566; Alexandria (modern-day Egypt)
- Relatives: Germanus (father), Justinian (brother), Justin II (cousin), John (brother-in-law)
- Military career
- Allegiance: Byzantine Empire
- Rank: magister militum
- Conflicts: Lazic War

Flavius Mar. Petrus Theodorus Valentinus Rusticius Boraides Germanus Iustinus, simply and commonly known as Justin (Latin: Iustinus, Greek: Ἰουστῖνος; c. 525–566), was an Eastern Roman aristocrat and general. A member of the Justinian Dynasty and nephew of Emperor Justinian I (r. 527–565), he was appointed as one of the last Roman consuls in 540, before going on to assume senior military commands in the Balkans and in Lazica. He fought against the Slavs, the Sassanid Persians and supervised the Byzantine Empire's first contacts with the Avars. At the time of Justinian's death, he was seen as a probable successor, but was beaten to the throne by his cousin, Justin II (r. 565–578), who exiled him to Egypt, where he was murdered.

== Biography ==
=== Early life and campaigns ===
Justin was born around 525, the eldest son of Germanus and his wife Passara. Germanus was a cousin of the Byzantine emperor Justinian I (r. 527–565) and thus a member of the wider Justinian dynasty and cousin to Justinian's successor, Emperor Justin II (r. 565–578). In 540, he was named ordinary consul at a very young age; he is illustrated as beardless in his consular diptych, and is still mentioned as a "young man" by Procopius nine years later. At this point, he already held the title of vir illustris and the honorary office of comes domesticorum. In the same year, he accompanied his father to the East against the Sassanid Persians, but saw no action. In 549, he was instrumental in the revelation of the plot to overthrow Emperor Justinian by the Armenian general Artabanes and his associates. The conspirators intended to assassinate Emperor Justinian and his favourite general Belisarius, and raise Germanus to the Byzantine throne. Notified of their intentions, Justin informed his father, who then told Marcellus, the Count of the Excubitors, leading to the plotters' arrest.

The northern Balkans in Late Antiquity.

In 550, together with his younger brother Justinian, he joined their father in his expedition against Ostrogoth Italy, but Germanus died suddenly in the autumn of 550, before the army had left the Balkans, where it was assembling. After this, Justinian and Germanus's son-in-law, John, led the army towards Salona (modern Split, Croatia), where the eunuch Narses assumed command in late 551. In early 551, Justin was attached to a force under the eunuch Scholasticus that campaigned against a Slavic raid in the eastern Balkans. The Byzantines were initially defeated near Adrianople but went on to score a victory, after which the Slavs left Byzantine lands. In early 552, Justin and Justinian were placed at the head of another expedition against a Slavic raid against Illyricum, but their forces were too small to confront the raiders directly. Instead, the brothers had to content themselves with harassing them. Shortly after, they were ordered north to assist the Lombards against the Gepids along with Aratius, Suartuas, and Amalafridas, but the Byzantines were detained from advancing too far north by the need to suppress religious strife in the city of Ulpiana.

=== High command in Lazica and the Danube ===
Map of Lazica

In 554, now experienced in military affairs, Justin was sent east to Lazica to join the Byzantine forces under Bessas, Buzes, and Martin. His first encounter with the Persians was unsuccessful. Along with Bessas, Justin and his troops were encamped at the plain of Chytropolia, near the strategically important fortress of Telephis, which was held by Martin. The Persian general Mihr-Mihroe, however, succeeded in dislodging Martin from Telephis. Martin withdrew to join the other two generals at Chytropolia, but there again the Byzantine army, too slow to take up position, was forced to flee in disarray before the advancing Persians, retreating along the Phasis river to the fortified island of Nesos (Νήσος, Greek for "island"). Bessas was dismissed from high command as magister militum per Armeniam after this debacle, and succeeded by Martin with Justin as his second in command. Justin was ignorant of Martin's intention to assassinate their ally, the Lazic king Gubazes II; when he learned of the deed, he was shocked, but did not reprimand Martin because he believed – wrongly – that the murder had been carried out at the orders of Emperor Justinian.

The Byzantines then launched an attack on the Persian fort of Onoguris, but they were forced to abandon it at the unexpectedly quick arrival of Persian relief forces under Nachoragan. In spring 556, Justin was with the rest of the Byzantine forces at Nesos, when Nakhoragan invaded western Lazica, making for the town of Phasis. The Byzantines hastily departed for the town, managing to reach it before the Persian army and then proceeded to successfully defend it during a prolonged siege. Following this success, in early 556 Justin returned to Nesos to guard it together with Buzes, while the rest of the army marched against the Misimians, a tribe that had recently allied itself with the Persians and killed the Byzantine general Soterichus. Justin's only activity during this time was to dispatch one of his officers, Elminzur, to capture Rhodopolis (modern Vartsikhe) with 2,000 cavalry. In the next year, a general truce was agreed, which was finalized into a peace treaty in 562.

Soon after, an imperial investigation into Gubazes's murder brought to light Martin's culpability. His military successes spared his life, but cost him his command; he was replaced as magister militum per Armeniam by Justin in spring 557. It was in this capacity that in late 557 Justin received the first Avar embassy to the Byzantine Empire. The Avars, who had fled their ancestral lands in Central Asia before the rise of the Göktürks, asked for imperial protection and for land to settle on. Justin forwarded them to Constantinople, where they arrived in December. Turned away from the Empire and towards the plains of Ukraine by Justinian, the Avars defeated enemy after enemy and eventually reached the northeastern bank of the Danube in 561/562. There they again encountered Justin, who had just been transferred to the command of the quaestura exercitus covering the lower Danubian limes (the Limes Moesiae). At this time, the Avars demanded to settle in Byzantine imperial territory in Scythia Minor, whose defences had been devastated by a recent Kotrigur invasion led by Zabergan. Here, Justin played a crucial role and gained great fame, by learning of the Avars' intentions and warning Justinian. Consequently, the Avar embassy to Constantinople was detained while the Byzantine defences were put in order. With Justin continuing to maintain a careful watch over the Danube river, the Avars contented themselves with the annual subsidy paid by Byzantium, and left the Empire in peace for some years to come.

=== Exile and death ===
At the time of Emperor Justinian's death in 565, due to his titles and reputation as a commander, as well his army's proximity to the imperial capital, he was the leading contender for the vacant throne, along with his cousin Justin, the curopalates. The latter, however, was already present at Constantinople, and could count on the support of the Byzantine Senate, and especially of Patriarch John Scholasticus and the Count of the Excubitors Tiberius, whom he had helped secure his post. Thus Justin was hastily elevated to the throne on the same day that Justinian died. According to the contemporary historian Evagrius Scholasticus, the two Justins had reached an agreement whereby whoever would be crowned emperor would make the other the "second man" in the empire. When Justin II recalled his cousin to Constantinople, it seemed that this was the reason. The general was warmly received at first, but soon the new emperor began to make accusations against him, dismissed his bodyguard and placed him under house arrest, before sending him to exile in Alexandria, ostensibly as the new augustal prefect of Egypt. There, he was murdered in his sleep, ostensibly because he was plotting to seize the throne, and his head was cut off and brought to Constantinople. In reality, he was too great a threat to the new emperor to be left alive; the Visigoth chronicler John of Biclaro explicitly attributes the murder to Justin II's wife, the Empress Sophia.

== Sources ==
- Bury, John Bagnell (1958) [1923]. History of the Later Roman Empire: From the Death of Theodosius I to the Death of Justinian, Volume 2. Mineola, New York: Dover Publications. OCLC 41478187.
- Evans, James Allan Stewart (1996). The Age of Justinian: The Circumstances of Imperial Power. New York, New York: Routledge. ISBN 0-415-02209-6.
- Greatrex, Geoffrey; Lieu, Samuel N. C. (2002). The Roman Eastern Frontier and the Persian Wars (Part II, 363–630 AD). London, United Kingdom: Routledge. ISBN 0-415-14687-9.
- Martindale, John R., ed. (1992). The Prosopography of the Later Roman Empire: Volume III, AD 527–641. Cambridge: Cambridge University Press. ISBN 0-521-20160-8.

Preceded by Strategius Apion	Consul of the Roman Empire; 540	Succeeded by Anicius Faustus Albinus Basilius
