= Angilas =

6th-century Byzantine taxiarch

Angilas (Greek: Ἀγγίλας) was a Byzantine taxiarch, active in the Lazic War (541-562). The main source about him is Agathias.

== Biography ==
=== Title and position ===
Angilas is first mentioned in 556, as a taxiarch in Lazica. His title is only recorded in the Greek language. His Latin title may have been comes rei militaris. He is first recorded leading a tagma of Moors in the Siege of Phasis. His troops are described as peltasts and spearmen (Greek: Μαυρουσίους πελταστάς και λογχοφόρους), probably meaning they were only armed with shield and lances. His troops were stationed at the "middle part" of the fortifications, alongside Theodore and Philomathius. Theodore led heavy infantry consisting of Tzani, Philomathius led Isaurian slingers and dart-throwers The Tzani were a tribe of the Caucasus. Procopius reports that "From ancient times, the Tzani have lived as an independent people".

=== Siege of Phasis ===
Phasis was besieged by forces of the Sassanid Empire. Martinus, the overall commander of the Byzantine troops, had given instructions to the whole army to stay at their respective posts. They were to disregard attempts of the Sassanids to have them exit the fortifications and fight in the open. However, Angilas and Philomathius led about two hundred of their men in opening a town gate. They exited the town and attacked a force of Sassanids whose archers were harassing the defenders. Theodore at first attempted to restrain them. But then bowed down to "majority opinion" and followed them in attacking. He was reportedly reluctant to violate orders, but unwilling to be branded a coward by the soldiers.

The Byzantine force was heavily outnumbered. Agathias reports that they "would almost certainly have been annihilated". But they were saved by an error of the Dilimnites (Daylamites). The Dilimnites were a force of auxiliaries, originating in the mountains of Persia. "They fought on foot, armed each with a sword, a shield, and three javelins". They decided against attacking the Byzantines from a distance. Instead, they "calmly awaited their approach" and then easily performed an encirclement. But the encircled Byzantines started a desperate attack on the enemies positioned closer to the town walls. The Dilimnites "opened up their ranks and made way from them" instead of facing the furious attack. Angilas and the others escaped back to the safety of the city. Agathias remarks both on the futility of their action and on how "they had risked their lives to save their skins!"

Later in the siege, a number of panicked Sassanid troops had started a gradual retreat. Most of the Dilimnites left their positions to "relieve those who were being hard pressed". Angilas and Theodore noticed that there were few troops left besieging their section of the fortifications. They led a sortie against the besiegers. The few Dilimnites left behind were either slain or forced to flee, "pressed in relentless pursuit" by the Byzantine force. The majority of the Dilimnites noted that their "kinsmen" were in peril. They abandoned their current positions in an attempt to face Angilas and Theodore. But their counterattack was disorganized and ineffective.

=== Byzantine victory ===
The nearby Sassanid forces thought that the Dilimnites were retreating in haste. Said forces panicked and started fleeing "ignominiously in all directions". The Dilimnites were left unsupported "and rushed to join them in flight". Agathias regards them as the cause and victims of a "double misunderstanding". Angilas and Theodore had succeeded in causing a general flight of the Sassanid forces. The rest of the Byzantine troops "sallied forth from behind the walls" and started pursuing the fleeing enemies. The entire left wing of the Sassanid army fell apart, leaving their intact right wing "fighting a vigorous rear-guard action". The Persians reportedly lost at least "ten thousand fighting men" and most of their siege equipment by the time night fell. The Byzantine casualties "did not number more than two hundred". The Byzantines set the siege equipment on fire. The servants of the porters of the Sassanid army reportedly mistook the smoke for a sign that the city had fallen. They started rushing towards the Byzantine lines. Nearly "two thousand men" were killed that night, others captured. Nachoragan, the Sassanid general, was already running out of supplies and winter was approaching. He broke off the siege and retreated the following day. His troops headed towards Kotais and Muchereisis. Sassanid reinforcements arrived too late to make a difference and also retreated.

The fate of Angilas following the end of the siege is unknown.

== Sources ==
- Amirav, Hagit; Haar Romeny, Bas ter (2007), From Rome to Constantinople: studies in honour of Averil Cameron, Peeters Publishers, ISBN 978-90-429-1971-6
- Frendo, Joseph D., ed. (1975), Agathias: The Histories, Berlin and New York: Walter de Gruyter, ISBN 978-3-11-003357-1
- Bury, John Bagnell (1889), A History of the Later Roman Empire from Arcadius to Irene, Vol. II, MacMillan & Co., ISBN 1-60520-405-6
- Martindale, John R., ed. (1992). The Prosopography of the Later Roman Empire: Volume III, AD 527–641. Cambridge: Cambridge University Press. ISBN 0-521-20160-8.
