= Siege of Phasis =

Military action during the Lazic War

- Part of the Lazic War
- Map of Lazica
Date	July 555 – June 556 AD
Location	Phasis 42°09′00″N 41°40′00″E
Result	Byzantine victory

Belligerents
Sasanian Empire	Byzantine Empire; Lazica

Commanders and leaders
Nachoragan	Martin; Justin; Dabragezas; Elmingir

Strength
~60,000	20,000 or less

Casualties and losses
10,000 killed	200 killed

The siege of Phasis took place in 555–556 during the Lazic War between the Byzantine and Sasanian Empires. Expecting an easy victory, the Persians besieged the town of Phasis in Lazica, held by the Byzantines, but were defeated in the ensuing irregular battle. The main source for the siege is the 6th-century historian Agathias.

== Background ==
The Lazic War had started in 541 with the defection of the Lazi under their king Gubazes II from Byzantium to Persia. The Persians quickly overran the country, but after Gubazes learned that the Persians planned to kill him, deport his people, and bring in Persian colonists, he asked the Byzantines for help.

In 554, the Persians won a major victory against the Laz-Byzantine forces at Telephis, forcing the latter to withdraw to the western parts of the country, and in the next year they were able to thwart a Byzantine attack on the fortress of Onoguris. In the spring of 555, the Persian general Nachoragan took the initiative in besieging the major Laz-Byzantine stronghold, the town of Phasis, which lay at the mouth of the namesake river.

== Opposing forces and preparations for the siege ==
Nachoragan led an army of ca. 60,000 men. The Byzantine forces of the area were led by the magister militum per Armeniam Martin and his second-in-command Justin, son of Germanus. Their combined forces were less than 20,000 men. Nachoragan could expect an easy victory as the town and its fortifications were built of wood and were vulnerable to fire.

The town's location between the Black Sea and the River Phasis secured it from the east, north, and west. At its south side, a moat was its first line of defense. Nachoragan's forces however emptied the moat after days of hard work, and managed to surround the town from its river side too by building a bridge of boats across the Phasis. Meanwhile, the Byzantines had organized the defense of the city, with their forces taking their places at the various sides of the fortifications.

The extreme western side, the one closest to the river, was guarded by Justin, while Martin positioned himself in the south-western side. The south side was defended by Angilas, Theodore, and Philomathius. Angilas is recorded leading a regiment of Moorish peltasts and spearmen, probably meaning they were only armed with shield and lances. Theodore led heavy infantry consisting of Tzani, a recently Christianized tribe living in the mountains above Trapezus, while Philomathius led Isaurian slingers and dart-throwers. The south-eastern side was guarded by Gibrus, who led a combined force of Heruli and Lombards. The extreme eastern side was guarded by Valerian, leading forces from the praetorian prefecture of the East. Their composition is not recorded. Finally, the Byzantine ships were placed under the protection of Dabragezas the Wend and Elmingir (Elminegeir) the Hun.

== Siege ==
Operations started with a volley of arrows from the Persians. Martin, the overall commander of the Byzantine troops, had given instructions to the whole army to stay at their respective posts. They were to disregard attempts by the Persians to induce them to sally forth from the fortifications and fight in the open. However, Angilas and Philomathius with about two hundred of their men opened a town gate, exited the town and attacked the nearest force of Sassanids whose archers were harassing the defenders. Theodore at first attempted to restrain them, but then bowed down to "majority opinion" and followed them in attacking. He was reportedly reluctant to violate orders, but unwilling to be branded a coward by the soldiers.

The Byzantine force was heavily outnumbered, and Agathias reports that they "would almost certainly have been annihilated", but they were saved by an error of the Dailamites. The Dailamites were a force of auxiliaries, originating in the mountains of Persia. "They fought on foot, armed each with a sword, a shield, and three javelins". They decided against attacking the Byzantines from a distance, and instead they "calmly awaited their approach" and then easily performed an encirclement. The encircled Byzantines however began a desperate attack on the enemies positioned closer to the town walls, and the Dailamites "opened up their ranks and made way from them" instead of standing their ground. Thus Angilas and the others escaped back to the safety of the city.

Martin eventually conceived a ruse of war, which would both raise the morale of his soldiers and spread fear in enemy units. He called the army in an assembly, supposedly to discuss further measures of defense. The assembly was interrupted by an unknown person, posing as a messenger from Constantinople. Martin reported the contents of the "imperial message" to all those assembled. The fabricated message congratulated the defenders for their valour and informed them that reinforcements were approaching, and the "messenger" claimed that they were camped near the River Neocnus, at a short distance from the town itself. Martin then feigned indignation that newcomers would share the glory and spoil "with those who had borne the burden and the heat", to which his troops shouted their approval, being motivated to action.

The Byzantine reinforcements did not in fact exist, but news of their approach reached Nachoragan, who reacted in two ways. He first sent out a large reconnaissance force to locate and observe the Byzantine reinforcements, and then launched the rest of his forces in a general attack on the walls, hoping to capture the city before the reinforcements arrived. He boasted that he would burn the city and its inhabitants down, and sent his camp servants to the nearby woods and instructed them to gather timber to burn down the city. He also instructed them to watch for great smoke rising to the heavens, for it would mean that the city had fallen and that they should immediately return to help.

While Nachoragan was forming his plan, Justin decided to take advantage of the calm before the storm: he exited the city, leading a force of 5,000 men cavalrymen and an infantry brigade to "a church of great sanctity in the vicinity". The Persians somehow failed to notice their departure, and began their great attack that same morning. Arrows and darts filled the air, while Sassanid siege weapons were attempting to destroy the wooden walls. The defenders answered by throwing "huge blocks of stone" at the weapons and smaller stones at the enemy soldiers. The initial stages of the fight lasted long enough for Justin to return from his pilgrimage. He could not return to the city, but was able to organize his own forces and attack the rear of the enemy force. Their sudden attack spread havoc, breaking through enemy lines. At least some of the Sassanid forces believed that Justin's men were the rumoured Byzantine reinforcements.

Panicked Sassanid troops started to retreat, and most of the Dailamites left their positions to "relieve those who were being hard pressed". Angilas and Theodore noticed that there were few troops left besieging their section of the fortifications and led a sortie against the besiegers. The few Dailamites left behind were either slain or forced to flee, "pressed in relentless pursuit" by the Byzantine force. The other Dailamites noted that their kinsmen were in peril and abandoned their current positions in an attempt to face Angilas and Theodore, but their counterattack was disorganized and ineffective.

The nearby Persian forces in turn thought that the Dailamites were retreating in haste, panicked and started fleeing "ignominiously in all directions". The Dailamites were left unsupported and "rushed to join them in flight". Agathias regards them as the cause and victims of a "double misunderstanding". Angilas and Theodore thus succeeded in causing a general flight of the Sassanid forces. The rest of the Byzantine troops sallied forth from behind the walls and started pursuing the fleeing enemies. The entire left wing of the Sassanid army fell apart, although the right wing remained unbroken and continued to fight.

The right wing included the war elephants of the Sasanian force. They might have stopped the Byzantine advance, but one of the elephants panicked and turned against the Persian ranks. The horses of the Sasanian cavalry were terrified of the attacking elephant, panicked in turn and bolted. In the confusion, the Sasanian forces scattered. Nachoragan gave the command to retreat, but by that time most of his forces had either already fled the battlefield or were in the process of doing so.

By the time night fell, the Persians had reportedly lost at least ten thousand fighting men (mostly the paygan forces) and most of their siege equipment. The Byzantine casualties "did not number more than two hundred". The Byzantines set the siege equipment on fire. The servants and porters of the Sassanid army reportedly mistook the smoke for a sign that the city had fallen, and started rushing towards the Byzantine lines. Nearly two thousand of them were killed that night, others captured.

== Aftermath ==
Nachoragan was already running out of supplies and winter was approaching. He broke off the siege and retreated the following day. His troops headed towards Kotais and Mochereisis. Sasanian reinforcements arrived too late to make a difference and also retreated. The Byzantine forces were left in undisputed control of the western districts of Lazica. Nachoragan eventually crossed into Caucasian Iberia to winter, leaving the command of the Sasanians in Lazica to his subordinate Vaphrizes. According to Agathias, the frustrated Sasanian king Khosrau I (r. 531–579) flayed the commander alive and kept his skin on display as a warning to deter any Persian from fleeing before the enemy. An armistice was signed in the following year, with further negotiations for a more permanent peace taking place soon after.

== Sources ==
- Bury, John Bagnell (1889), A History of the Later Roman Empire from Arcadius to Irene, Vol. I, MacMillan & Co., ISBN 978-1-4021-8369-0
- Bury, John Bagnell (1958) [1923], History of the Later Roman Empire: From the Death of Theodosius I to the Death of Justinian, Volume 2, Mineola, New York: Dover Publications, OCLC 41478187
- Evans, J.A.S. (1996), The Age of Justinian: The Circumstances of Imperial Power, Routledge, ISBN 978-0-415-02209-5
- Frendo, Joseph D., ed. (1975), Agathias: The histories, Walter de Gruyter, ISBN 978-3-11-003357-1
- Holmes, William Gordon (1905), The age of Justinian and Theodora: a history of the sixth century A.D., vol. II, G. Bell and sons, ISBN 978-1-4212-5069-4
- Greatrex, Geoffrey; Lieu, Samuel N. C. (2002), The Roman Eastern Frontier and the Persian Wars (Part II, 363–630 AD), Routledge, ISBN 0-415-14687-9
- Martindale, John R.; Jones, A.H.M.; Morris, John (1992), The Prosopography of the Later Roman Empire, Volume III: AD 527–641, Cambridge University Press, ISBN 0-521-20160-8
- Petersen, Leif Inge Ree (15 September 2013). Siege Warfare and Military Organization in the Successor States (400-800 AD): Byzantium, the West and Islam. BRILL. ISBN 978-90-04-25446-6.
- Dmitriev, V. (2008). Борьба Римской (Византийской) империи и Сасанидского Ирана за преобладание в Передней Азии [The struggle between the Roman (Byzantine) Empire and Sassanid Iran for dominance in Western Asia] (in Russian). Pskov. ISBN 978-5-87854-429-0.
