= Alismereti =

Alismereti ალისმერეთი
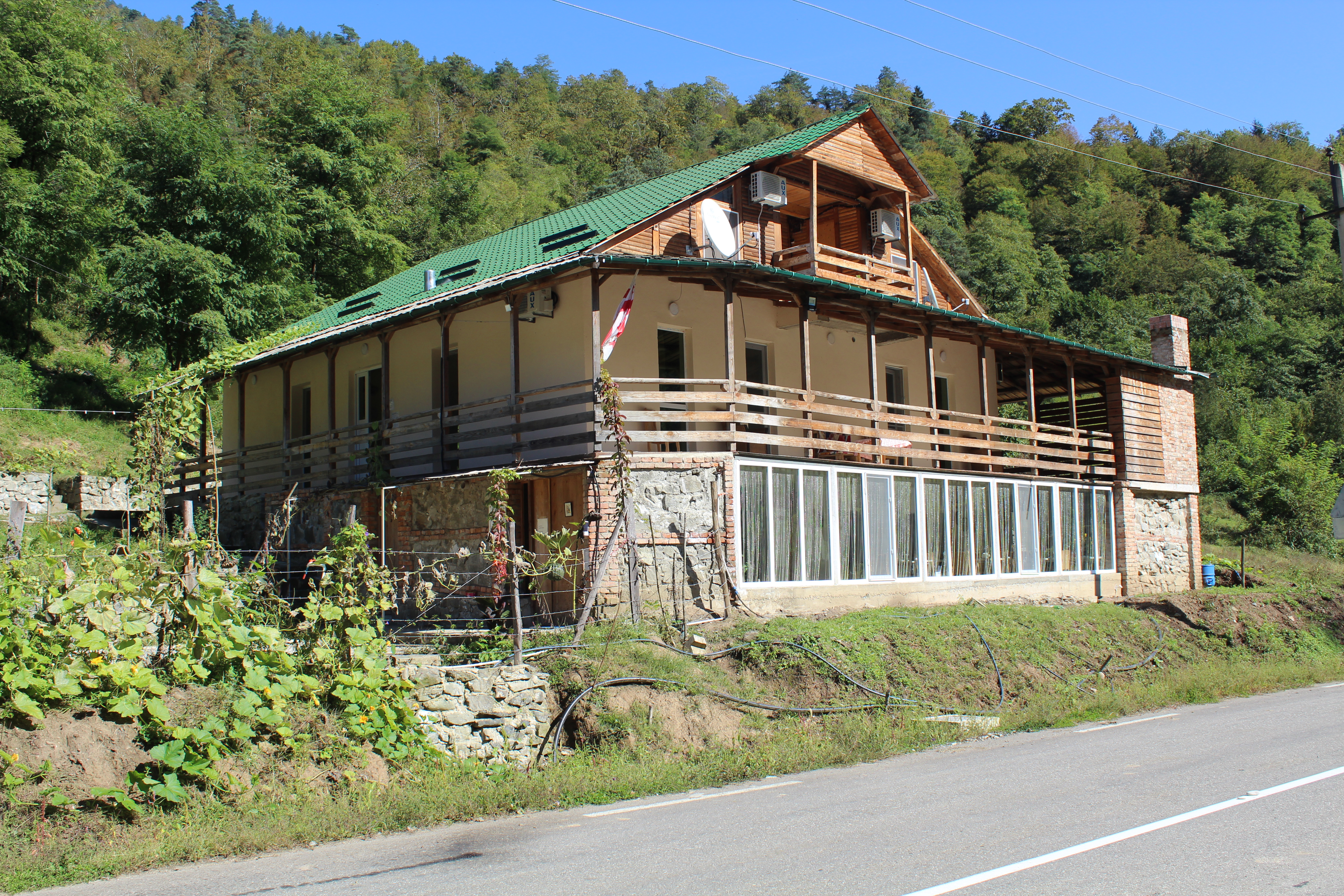

- Location in Georgia
- Coordinates: 41°59′49″N 42°53′51″E
- Country: Georgia
- Region: Imereti
- Municipality: Baghdati
- Elevation: 600 m (2,000 ft)

Population (2014)
  - Total: 5
- Time zone: UTC+4 (Georgian Time)

Alismereti (Georgian: ალისმერეთი) is a village in Nergeeti Community, Baghdati Municipality of Imereti region, Georgia. It is located North to Meskheti Range, on the right bank of Khanistskali River, 600 meters above sea level. It is located 15 km (9.3 mi) from the town of Baghdati.

== Demographics ==
According to 2014 general census Alismereti has a population of 5.

| Census date | Population | Male | Female |
|---|---|---|---|
| 2002 | 31 | 13 | 18 |
| 2014 | ▼5 | 3 | 2 |

== See also ==
- Imereti
- Baghdati Municipality

== Bibliography ==
- Georgian Soviet Encyclopedia, I, p. 312, Tbilisi, 1975
