= Mermeroes's campaign of 554 =

Battle during the Lazic War

- Part of the Lazic War
- Map of Lazica in Late Antiquity
Date	554 AD
Location	Telephis and Ollaria, Lazica
Result	Sasanian victory

Belligerents
Byzantine Empire; Lazica	Sasanian Empire

Commanders and leaders
Martinus; Bessas; Justin	Mermeroes

The assault on Telephis and Ollaria passes took place in 554 during the Lazic War between the Sasanian (Persian) Empire and the Byzantine Empire in Lazica.

Persian general Mermeroes sought to break through the Byzantine defenses at guarded mountain passes near Telephis and reach the Phasis River. He employed a stratagem to deceive the Byzantine forces by feigning illness and spreading rumors of his death; it was known that he was old and had crippled feet. The Byzantines lowered their guard and abandoned reconnaissance. Taking advantage of this opportunity, he led his army through the surrounding woods. The Byzantines were caught by surprise and unable to mount a resistance. Instead, they fled to the fortress of Nesos, approximately 28 km from Telephis. Mermeroes did not pursue them because of supply difficulties. He reinforced the fortress Onoguris, and withdrew to Cotais and Mucheirisis. He died of illness the following summer.

== Source ==
The primary source for this conflict is the Byzantine historian Agathias, who seems to have had access to the inquiry reports on the defeat.

== Background ==
The Lazic War began in 541 when the Sasanian king Khosrow I invaded Lazica, a Byzantine client kingdom, with the support of King Gubazes II, who had turned against Byzantine monopoly trade policies. Seeking access to the Black Sea, Khosrow captured the Byzantine fortress of Petra after a successful siege but withdrew back to his homeland due to Byzantine advances in the south. He subsequently sought to strengthen Persian control by establishing larger garrisons, prompting resistance among the Lazi, who feared losing their independence. In 547, after uncovering a Persian plot to assassinate Gubazes and deport the Lazi, Gubazes renewed his alliance with Byzantium. Emperor Justinian I accepted the offer, and he sent an 8,000-strong army under Dagisthaeus. Dagisthaeus and Gubazes jointly laid siege to Petra, however, Dagisthaeus failed to guard the mountain passes, allowing the Persian general Mermeroes to march into Lazica and relieve the fortress.

After the Lazi complained, Emperor Justinian I replaced Dagisthaeus with the general Bessas, who captured Petra after a year-long siege in 551. Mermeroes did not arrive in time to provide relief and instead redirected his army to besiege Archaeopolis, the capital of Lazica. However, the Byzantine defenders, while outnumbered, launched a surprise attack that routed the Persians. The two empires agreed to renew the five-year armistice in late 551, which excluded any conflicts in Lazica.

In early 553, the Persians received the money promised under the armistice. Khosrow used the money to recruit a force of Sabiri Huns and send them, alongside Persian troops, to reinforce Mermeroes. Bolstered by reinforcements to a force of 70,000, Mermeroes resumed his campaign against the remaining Byzantine and Lazi strongholds. Initially, he tried to capture a fortress of Tzibile, where Goubazes's sister was located, to gain leverage in the negotiations with the king of Lazica, but he failed. He then attempted to besiege Archaeopolis but once repulsed by the defenders, he had to retreat. Unlike the previous siege in 551, the garrison of Archaeopolis pursued the retreating enemy through a narrow pass, inflicting heavy casualties on the Persians and Sabiri. Mermeroes subsequently retreated to Cotais and Mocheresis.

== Ruse ==
In early 554, Mermeroes sought to march his army, stationed nearby at Kutais, past the heavily guarded Byzantine fortress of Telephis and reach the Phasis River. Despite the numerical superiority of his forces, he could not break through the Byzantine-held gorges (narrow passages). Telephis was guarded by the magister militum per Armeniam Martinus. Byzantine commanders Bessas, and Justin, son of Germanus, stationed nearby at Ollaria. Mermeroes executed a strategem where he faked an illness. At the time, he was elderly and suffered from crippled feet, requiring him to be carried behind the troops. He disappeared from view, and later had informants spread false news of his death. Believing the enemy commander was dead, the Byzantine forces under Martinus let their guard down and stopped scouting.

Once this was done, Mermeroes led his army through the woods, clearing any obstacles, and caught the Byzantines by surprise. The Byzantines decided to stand their ground, sending 500 Tzani troops under Theodore to reconnoiter the enemy. After observing the situation near Telephis, the detachment withdrew. On their return, Theodore encountered Byzantine soldiers who had remained behind to plunder local Lazi huts rather than proceed to Ollaria, and reprimanded them. Historian Ilkka Syvänne considers that this encounter may have delayed him enough to prevent him from delivering his report on time. In the meantime, a Persian attack on the Byzantine plunderers drove them back to camp, spreading panic among the Byzantine troops and commanders.

== Aftermath ==
The Byzantines fled as far as the fortress Nesos (modern-day Isula), approximately 150 stades (28 km) from Telephis. Upon reaching Chrysopolia, Mermeroes chose not to pursue them because of the difficulties of supplying his army. Instead constructing a pontoon bridge across the Phasis River and reinforced the fort at Onoguris, near Archaeopolis, before withdrawing to Cotais and Mucheirisis. Mermeroes died in Iberia from an illness the following summer and was replaced by Nachoragan.
