= Elmingir =

Hunnic officer

Elmingir also Elminegeir, Elmingeir (fl. 555) was a Hun general fighting for the Byzantine Empire.

== Biography ==
He fought in the Lazic War, which saw the Byzantine Empire pitted against the Sasanian Empire. At the Siege of Phasis, he protected the Byzantine ships.

== Etymology ==
His name is, probably coincidentally, a homophone of Tungusic elmin, "young horse". This was also the name of a Manchu tribe. If such were indeed the origin of his name it would make it the only known Tungusic word in the Hunnic vocabulary.
