= Siege of Onoguris =

Battle during the Lazic War

- Part of the Lazic War
| Date | 554 or 555 AD |
| Location | Onoguris, Lazica 42°24′30″N 42°26′30″E |
| Result | Sasanian victory |

Belligerents
| Byzantine Empire; Herules | Sasanian Empire |

Commanders and leaders
| Martin; Bouzes; Wilgang the Herul; Usigardus; Dabragezas | Unnamed garrison commander Nachoragan |

Strength
| 50,000 | 3,000 cavalry Unknown number of garrison force |

Casualties and losses
| Heavy | Unknown |
- Location within Georgia

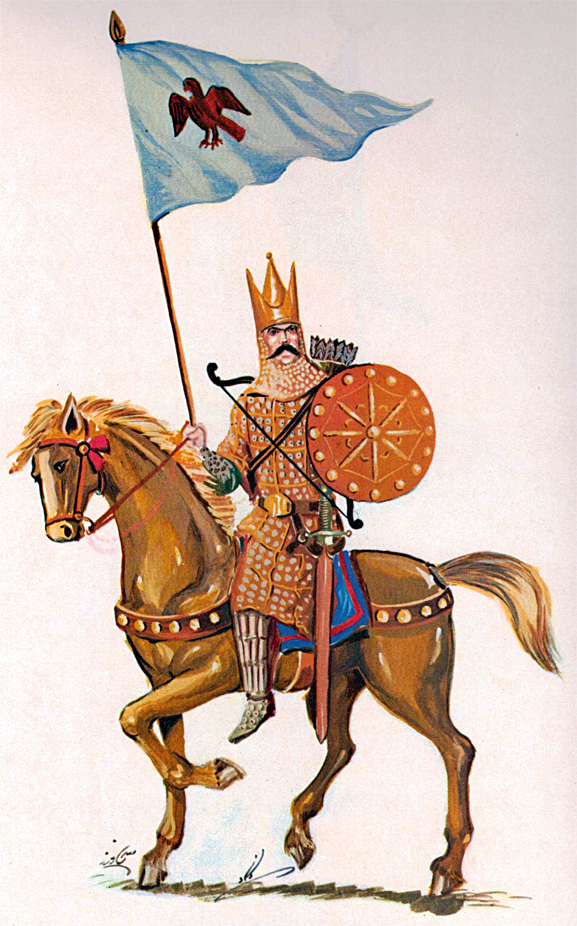
Artistic rendering of a asbaran cavalryman holding a banner of homa, a mythical bird of Iranian legends and fables

The siege of Onoguris occurred in 554 or 555 AD during the Lazic War between the Byzantine Empire and the Sasanian Empire.

The Byzantine generals led by Martin needed to score a quick victory on the battlefield to redress their assassination of the Byzantine ally King Gubazes II of Lazica. They launched a full-scale assault on the new Sasanian fort at Onoguris, which was located near the main Byzantine stronghold of Archaeopolis. The arrival of a small relief force under the new Sasanian commander Nachoragan turned the tide of the battle and resulted in an easy victory for the Sasanians instead. The Byzantines subsequently abandoned their base at Archaeopolis also, which was then destroyed by the Sasanians who now gained momentum.

== Background ==
After succeeding in dislodging the Byzantines from Telephis–Ollaria, the Persian commander in Lazica, Mermeroes, did not follow up the victory, but returned to Mocheresis and reinforced the Persian garrison at Onoguris on his way. The latter was near Archaeopolis, the main Byzantine stronghold in the region. Mermeroes died shortly afterward and was succeeded by Nachoragan.

After the defeat at Telephis, King Gubazes II of Lazica sent a complaint against the Byzantine generals to Emperor Justinian I, who then sent General Bessas into exile. Martin and Rusticus (not a commander), two others criticized by Gubazes, then assassinated the Lazic king. This resulted in confusion among the Lazi who abandoned their support for the Byzantines.

Martin immediately prepared a large force to capture the nearby Persian fort at Onoguris, expecting an easy victory. According to Agathias, Martin and those behind the assassination of the Lazic king wanted to gain a success which could defuse a volatile situation in case Emperor Justinian I would notice their culpability.

== Siege ==
In 554 or 555, the Byzantine force of 50,000 fighting men under Martin besieged the Persian fort of Onoguris using wicker roofs (spaliones), ballistae, and other siege equipment. A captured Persian revealed the approach of a Persian relief force from Mocheresis and Cutais under the new field commander Nachoragan, who had just replaced the deceased Mermeroes. The idea of a full-scale attack against the force was rejected; instead, a 600-strong force, under Dabragezas and Usigardus, was sent to ambush the relief force, while the main Byzantine force engaged in the siege. Agathias describes the siege to be "more like a pitched battle".

The Persian relief force (or a vanguard?) was caught off-guard and was routed, but soon it became clear that the pursuing force was not the main Byzantine army. So The Persians, an all-cavalry force numbering 3,000, turned against them and routed the pursuers. As both parties reached the Byzantine line, the main Byzantine force was seized with panic and fled together with their commanders. The Persian garrison then sallied and further contributed to the Byzantines' wavering. As the Byzantine cavalry fled, the infantry was left behind, and the narrowness of the bridge over the Catharus River further hampered their flight, many of them being killed in the subsequent stampede. Bouzes and his cavalry noticed the situation, returned, covered their retreat, and prevented their total annihilation.

As the pursuing Persians under Nachoragan reached Archaeopolis, they found the plain abandoned and momentarily demolished the Byzantine fortifications, looted their camp, and returned to the base.

== See also ==
- Byzantine–Sasanian War of 572–591
- Immortals (Sasanian Empire)
