= Corylus colchica =

Conservation status
- Vulnerable (IUCN 3.1)

Scientific classification
- Kingdom: Plantae
- Clade: Embryophytes
- Clade: Tracheophytes
- Clade: Angiosperms
- Clade: Eudicots
- Clade: Rosids
- Order: Fagales
- Family: Betulaceae
- Genus: Corylus
- Species: C. colchica

Binomial name
- Corylus colchica Albov

Species of flowering plant

Corylus colchica, also known as Corylus iberica, is a species of hazelnut endemic to Armenia and Georgia in the Caucasus region. It can tolerate more frost than many others of its genus. It produces small edible nuts in September. It is not commercially grown for food because the nuts are small in size. The nut's shell is oval and the nut is round. The tree is sometimes crossed with the common hazel to make a hybrid that can grow in colder climates.
