= Onoguris =

- Stephanopolis
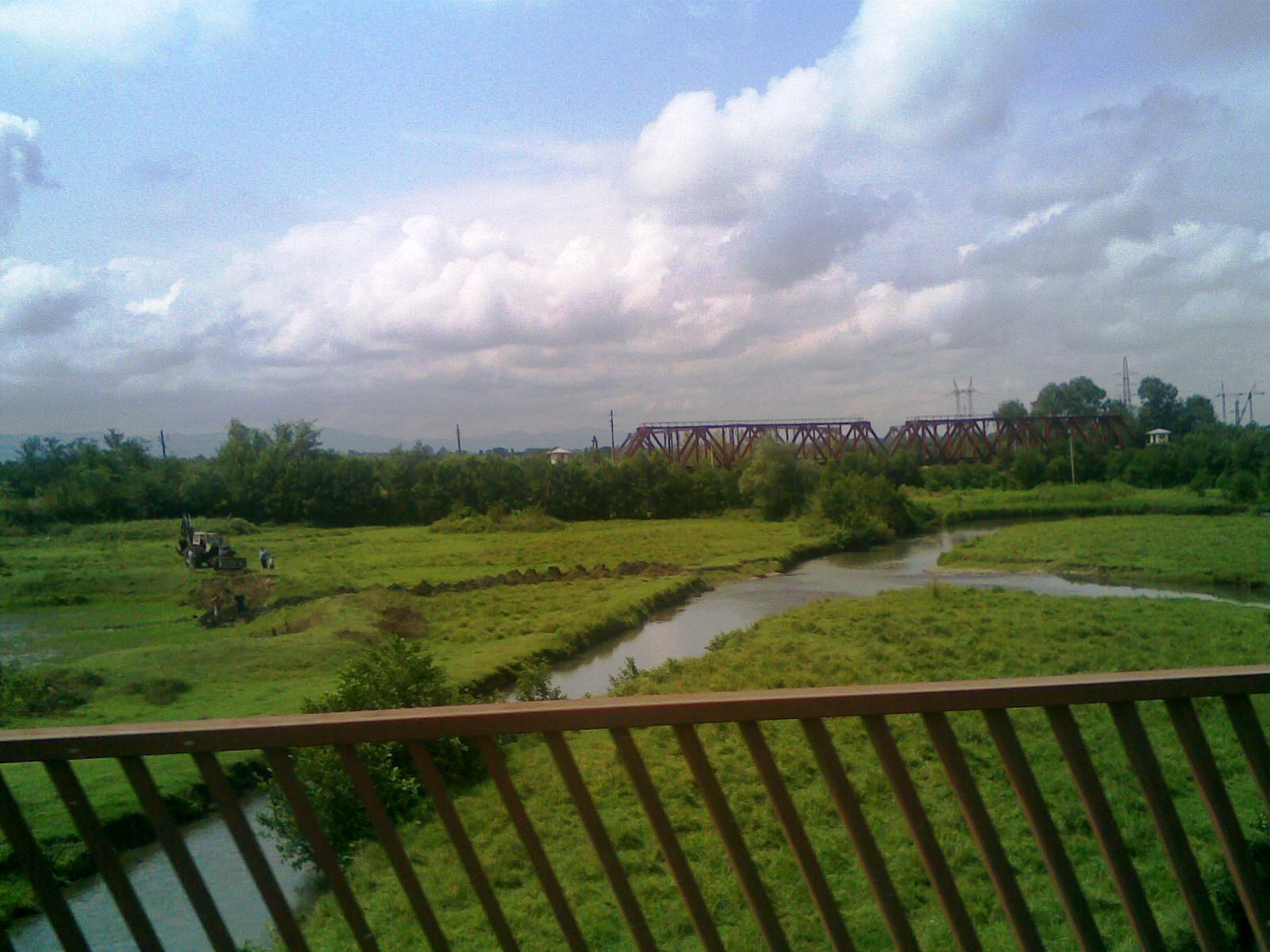
- Nogela River

- Location within Georgia
- 42°24′30″N 42°26′30″E
- Type: Settlement
- Location: Lazica

Onoguris, renamed as Stephanopolis in the Byzantine period, was a town in Lazica (in present-day western Georgia, possibly located at modern village Khuntsi) recorded by Byzantine historian Agathias in his narration of the Lazic War between the Byzantine Empire and the Sasanian Empire. Its exact location is still under study.

== History ==
Agathias derives the ancient name Onoguris from a branch of the Hunnic Onoguri, who had been defeated in this place by the local Colchians and thus the town was named after them. According to Agathias, there was a church in the town dedicated to St Stephen, after whom the city was renamed.

The Sasanian commander Mermeroes had fortified this town during his unsuccessful Siege of Archaeopolis. The Byzantines unsuccessfully besieged the fort in 554-555.

== Identification ==
Kaukhchishvili (1963) links the name "Onoguris" with that of the Unagira Mountain and locate the town on halfway between Tsikhegoji-Archaeopolis in the west and Kutaisi in the east. He also identifies the town with the fortress Ukimerion (also Uthimereos).

During the Nokalakevi expedition in the 1980s, archaeological excavations were undertaken at the Abedati Fortress (Georgian: აბედათის ციხესიმაგრე), Martvili Municipality, and later research papers linked it with Onoguris. However, Pailodze (2003) and Lomitashvili (2003) have separately criticized this identification.

Lekvinadzehas as well as Braund & Sinclair (2000) identified the town with modern Sepieti village, based on a 6th- or 7th-century Greek inscription addressing Saint Stephen in a basilica there.

Pailodze (2003) reported unexcavated remains on the hill at Khuntsi, and suggested them to be possible remains of Onoguris. There is also a river nearby, the Nogela River (Tskhenistsqali). In 2015, a small team from the Anglo-Georgian Expedition to Nokalakevi undertook an excavation of the site which they called Khuntsistsikhe ("the fortress of Khuntsi") which strengthen the identification, though they say more studies are needed to reach a conclusion.
