= Baghdati =

Baghdati ბაღდათი
- Town
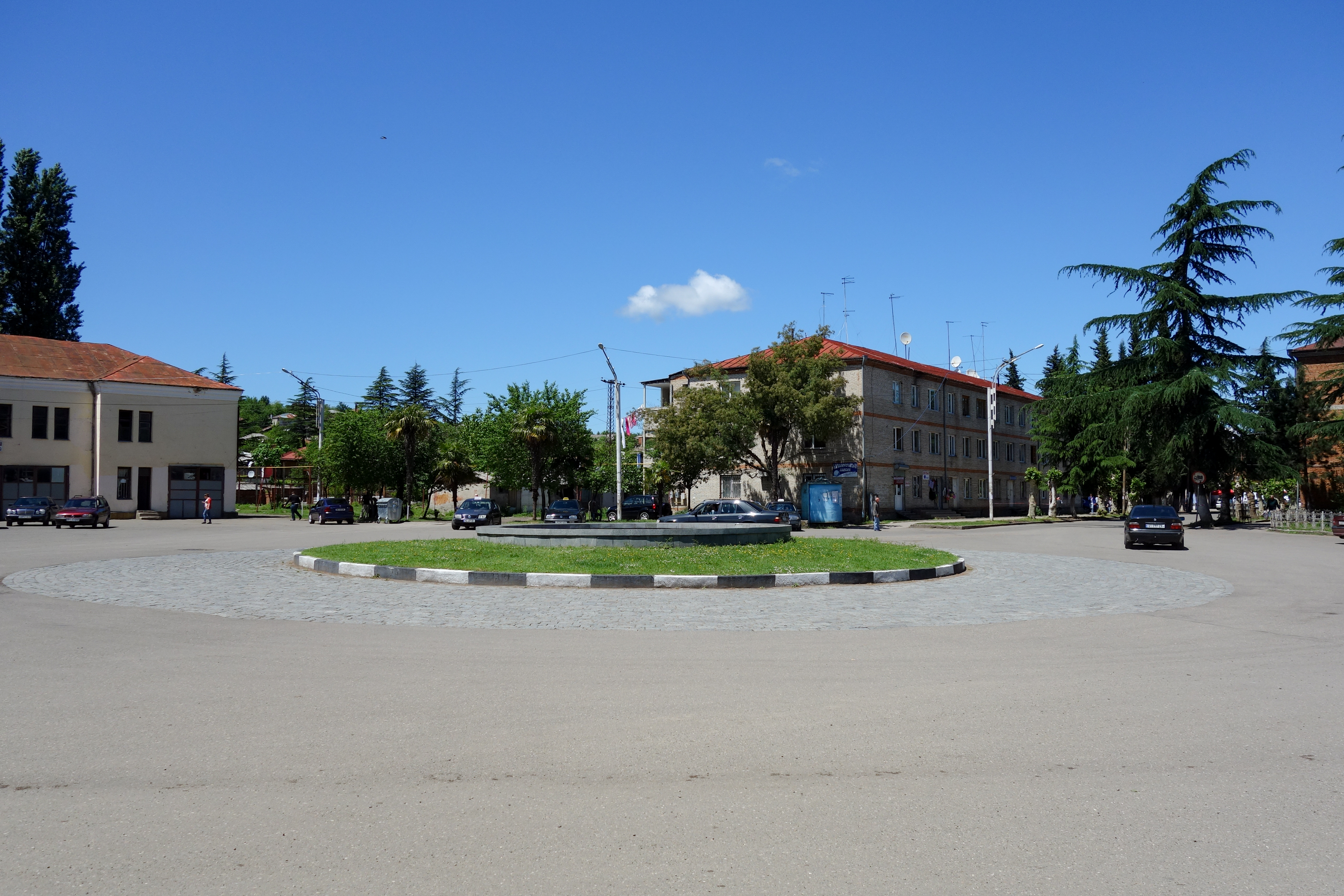
- Baghdati Town Center
- Interactive map of Baghdati
- Baghdati Baghdati (Imereti)
- Coordinates: 42°4′4″N 42°49′29″E
- Country: Georgia
- Region: Imereti
- District: Baghdati
- Elevation: 200 m (660 ft)

Population (2024)
  - Total: 2,511
- Time zone: Georgian Time (UTC+4)
- Climate: Cfa

Baghdati (Georgian: ბაღდათი, romanized: baghdati [b̥äɣd̪ät̪ʰi]) is a town of 3,700 people in the Imereti region of western Georgia, at the edge of the Ajameti forest on the river Khanistsqali, a tributary of the Rioni.

== Geography ==
The town is located at the edge of the Ajameti forest on the left bank of the river Khanistsqali, about 170 kilometres (110 mi) west-northwest of Tbilisi and 25 kilometres (16 mi) south-southeast of Kutaisi.

The climate of Baghdati can be classified as moderately humid subtropical (Köppen climate classification Cfa).

== History ==
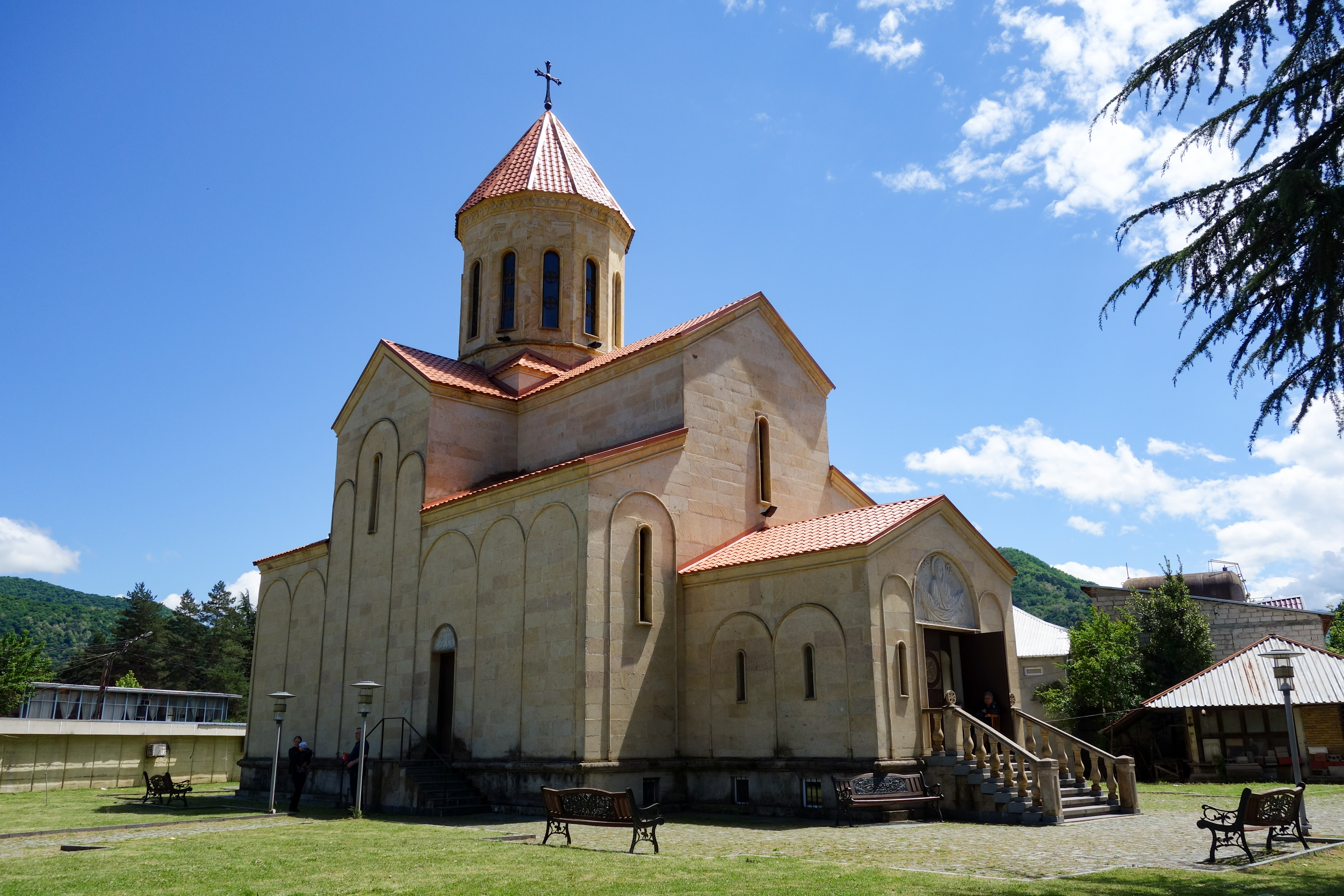
Baghdati Cathedral

Baghdati is one of the oldest villages in the historical region of Imereti. Its name shares the same roots as Baghdād, the capital of Iraq derived from the Pahlavi words bagh ("god") and dāti ("given"), translating to "God-given" or "God’s gift." The town has gone under many name changes throughout its history. During the Imperial and early Soviet era the town's name was adapted into its Russian form of Bagdadi. (Russian: Багдади) In 1940, it was renamed Mayakovsky (Georgian: მაიაკოვსკი; Russian: Маяковский), after the poet Vladimir Mayakovsky who was born in the settlement in 1893. In 1981, Mayakovsky was granted town status. In 1991, the original Georgian name was restored.

== Demographics ==
Year	Population
1959	4586
1970	4609
1979	4831
1989	5465
2002	4714
2009	4800
2014	3707

Note: Census data 1959–2014

== Notable people ==
- Vladimir Mayakovsky (1893–1930), poet
