= Nachoragan =

Sasanian military commander

- Naxwaragān
- Military career
- Allegiance: Sasanian Empire
- Branch: Sasanian army
- Commands: operations in the Lazic War
- Conflicts: Lazic War: Siege of Onoguris; Siege of Phasis

Nachoragan was a commander in the military of the Sasanian Empire recorded in the Lazic War by the Byzantine historians. He succeeded Mermeroes as the commander of the operations in Lazica after the latter's death. As he took the command, the political situation favored the Sasanians, as the assassination of the Lazic king Gubazes by Byzantine generals had alienated the Lazi. Nachoragan relieved the Siege of Onoguris and subsequently destroyed the Byzantine base at Archaeopolis. In the spring of 556 AD, Nachoragan began a new invasion by attacking Nesus with 60,000 men, where Martin and Justin were positioned. After the rejection of his peace proposals by Martin, Nachoragan besieged Phasis, but was heavily defeated. He then retreated to Kutais, left the command of the Sasanians in Lazica to his subordinate Vaphrizes shortly after, and retired to winter quarters in Iberia.

The Greek name Nachoragan (Ναχοραγάν) recorded by the Byzantine historians probably represents not a name but the Middle Persian title naxwaragān or naxwārakān/naxwāragān. It corresponds to the Syriac nkwrgn (ܢܟܘܪܓܢ, "governor") and the Armenian title nakharar, both of which are borrowed from Middle Iranian languages.
