= Plumbata =

Lead-weighted dart for infantry

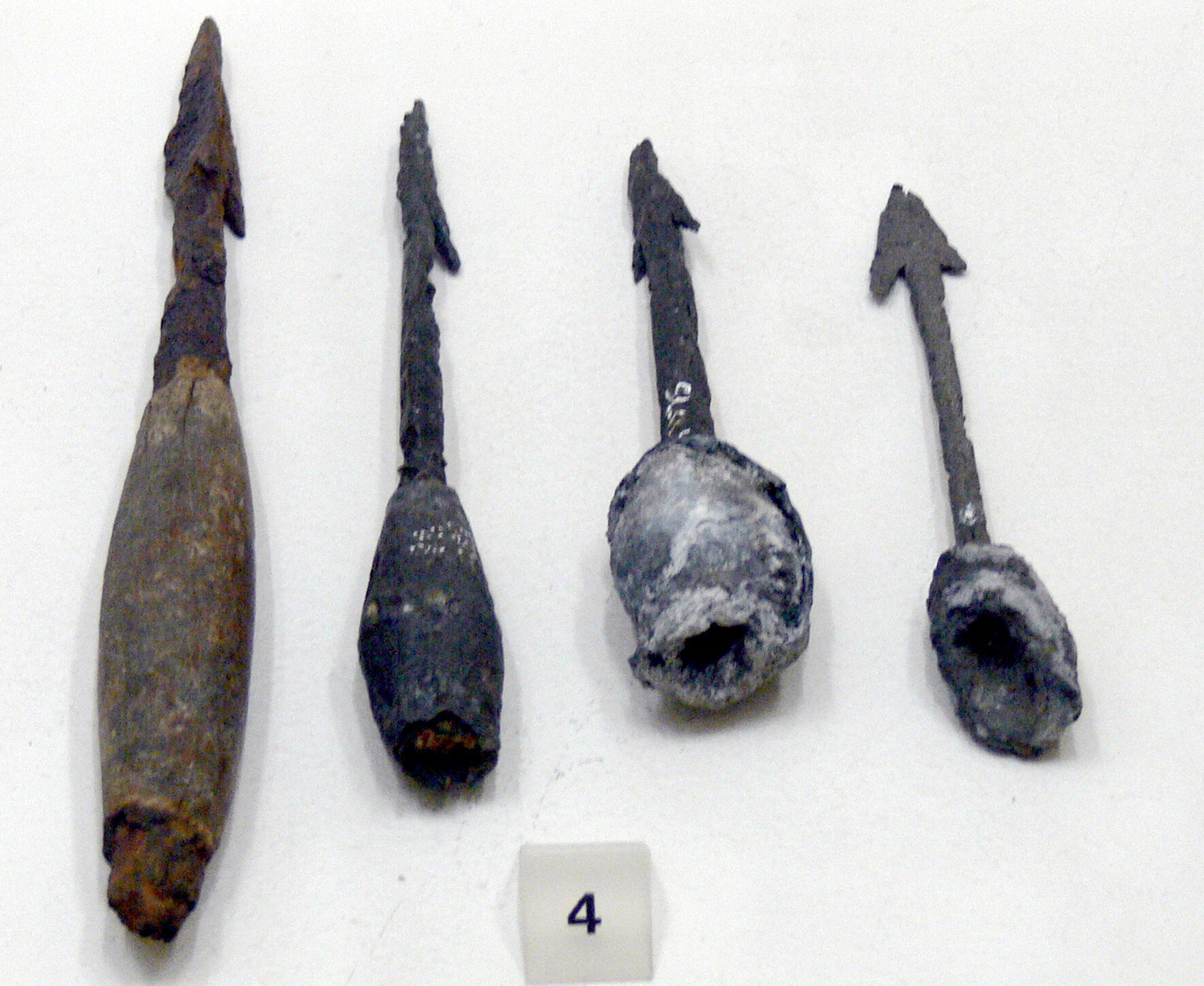
Four plumbata heads from the 4th or 5th century AD, found in Enns, Austria. The wooden shafts and fletching have decayed.

Plumbatae or martiobarbuli were lead-weighted throwing darts carried by infantrymen in Antiquity and the Middle Ages. They were used to inflict damage on enemies at a distance before engaging in close combat. Roman soldiers in some legions carried plumbatae inside their shields, which allowed them to have ranged weapons similar to arrows, according to Vegetius in his 4th-century military treatise De re militari.

The plumbata consisted of a lead-weighted head attached to a wooden shaft with fletching, which allowed soldiers to throw them effectively over long distances. The Roman work De rebus bellicis and the Byzantine manual of war Strategicon confirm their use and describe variations, such as the spiked plumbata (plumbata tribolata). Archaeological finds in Wroxeter and elsewhere confirm their description and use.

== History ==
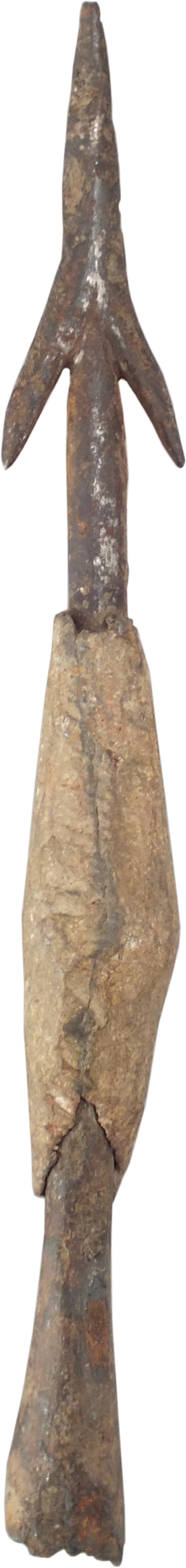
An example of a plumbata head. The complete weapon would have the head fixed on a wooden shaft with fletching.

The first examples seem to have been carried by the Ancient Greeks from about 500 BC onwards, but the best-known users were the late Roman and Eastern Roman armies. The earliest and best written source for these weapons refers to a period around 300 AD, though the document was composed around 390–450 AD.

The exercise of the loaded javelins, called martiobarbuli, must not be omitted. We formerly had two legions in Illyricum, consisting of six thousand men each, which from their extraordinary dexterity and skill in the use of these weapons were distinguished by the same appellation. They supported for a long time the weight of all the wars and distinguished themselves so remarkably that the emperors Diocletian and Maximian on their accession honored them with the titles of Jovian and Herculean and preferred them before all the other legions. Every soldier carries five of these javelins in the hollow of his shield. And thus the legionary soldiers seem to supply the place of archers, for they wound both the men and horses of the enemy before they come within reach of the common missile weapons

— Vegetius, De re militari, 1.17

A second source, also from the late 4th century, is an anonymous treatise titled De rebus bellicis, which briefly discusses (so far archaeologically unattested) spiked plumbatae (plumbata tribolata), but which is also the only source that shows an image of what a plumbata looked like. The image shows what looks like a short arrow with a weight attached to the shaft. Although only later copies of the original manuscript exist, this is confirmed by the remains which have so far turned up in the archaeological record.

A third source is the late 6th century Strategicon, written by the Byzantine emperor Maurice, who wrote about the martzobarboulon, a corruption of its Latin name martiobarbulum.

Plumbatae etymologically contain plumbum, or lead, and can be translated "lead-weighted [darts]". Martiobarbuli in this translation is mattiobarbuli in the Latin, which is most likely an assimilation of Martio-barbuli, "little barbs of Mars". The barb implied a barbed head, and Mars was the god of war (among other things).

Archaeology gives a clearer picture of martiobarbuli. The reference listed has an illustration of a find from Wroxeter identified as the head of a plumbata and a reconstruction of the complete weapon: a fletched dart with an iron head weighted with lead. The reconstruction seems entirely consistent with Vegetius' description.

War darts were also used in Europe later in the Middle Ages.

== See also ==
- Lawn darts
- Khuru (sport)
- Roman military personal equipment
