= Martin (magister militum per Armeniam) =

6th century Byzantine general

- Martinus
- Born: Thrace, Byzantine Empire
- Military career
- Allegiance: Byzantine Empire
- Branch: Byzantine army
- Rank: magister militum per Orientem (543–544) magister militum per Armeniam (555–556) strategos
- Conflicts: Iberian War Vandalic War: Battle of Tricamarum; Gothic War (535–554); Lazic War: Battle of Anglon (543); Siege of Edessa (544); Battle of Telephis–Ollaria; Siege of Onoguris; Siege of Phasis

Martin or Martinus was a Byzantine general of Thracian origin who served the Byzantine army during the reign of emperor Justinian I on various fronts.

He is first recorded to be active in Mesopotamia in 531 during the Iberian War. In 533, he took part in the successful Battle of Tricamarum in North Africa during the Vandalic War and remained active there until 536. From 536 to 540 he was active in Italy during the Gothic War (535–554). In 543-544 he briefly replaced Belisarius as the magister militum per Orientem, leading the disastrous invasion of Persarmenia during the Lazic War. In 544, he relieved Edessa of a Persian siege in exchange for gold. His last military activities was in 551–556 in the Caucasus during the Lazic War, including the assault on his stronghold at Telephis, his siege of Onoguris, and the Persian siege of Phasis. In 555, he had replaced Bessas as the magister militum per Armeniam.
