= Baghdati Municipality =

Coordinates: 42°05′N 42°50′E

Baghdati Municipality ბაღდადის მუნიციპალიტეტი
- Municipality
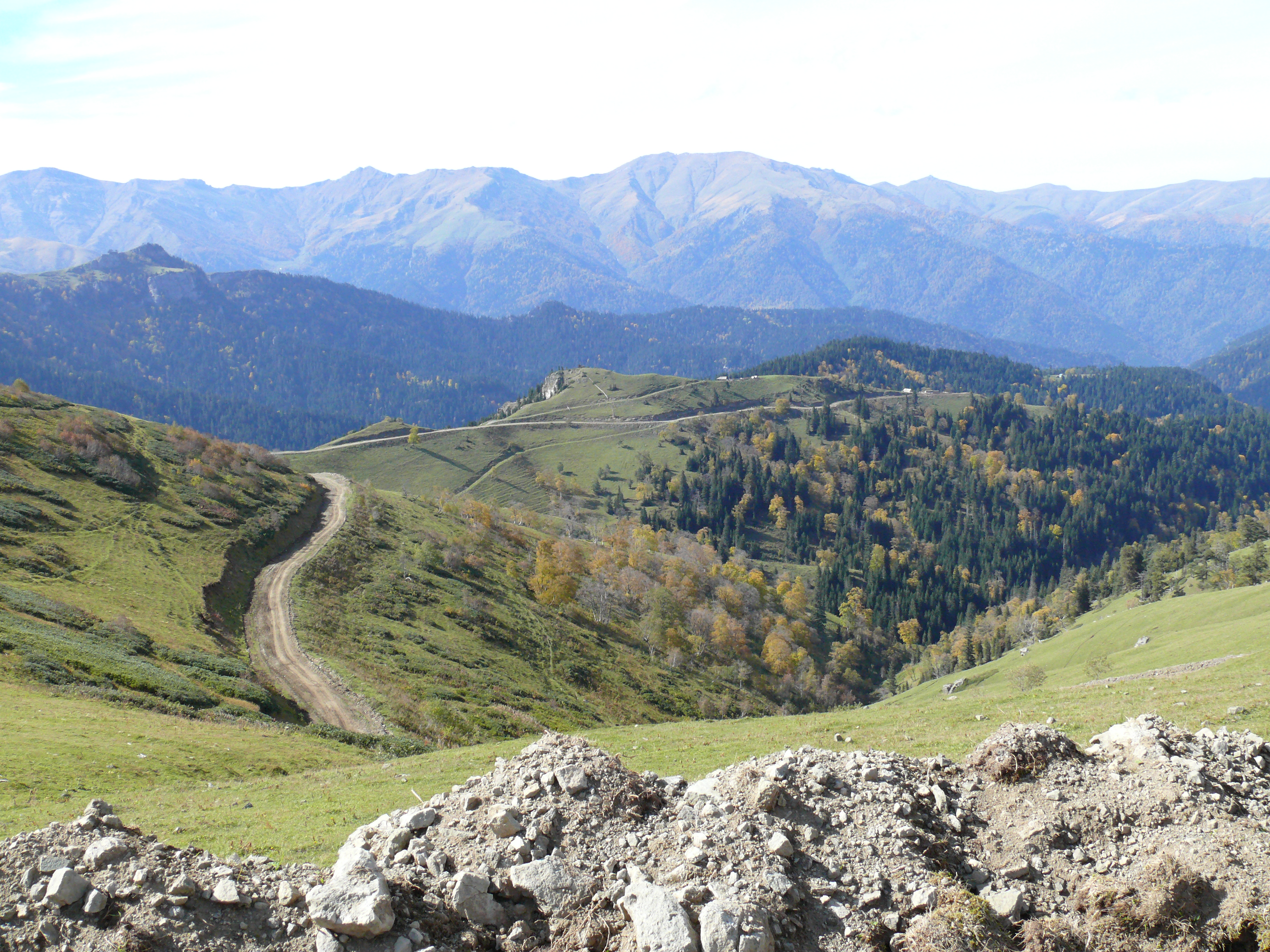
- Zekari Pass

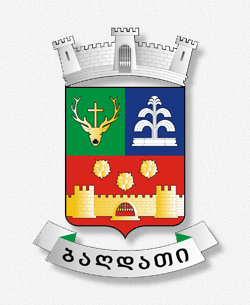
- Flag Seal

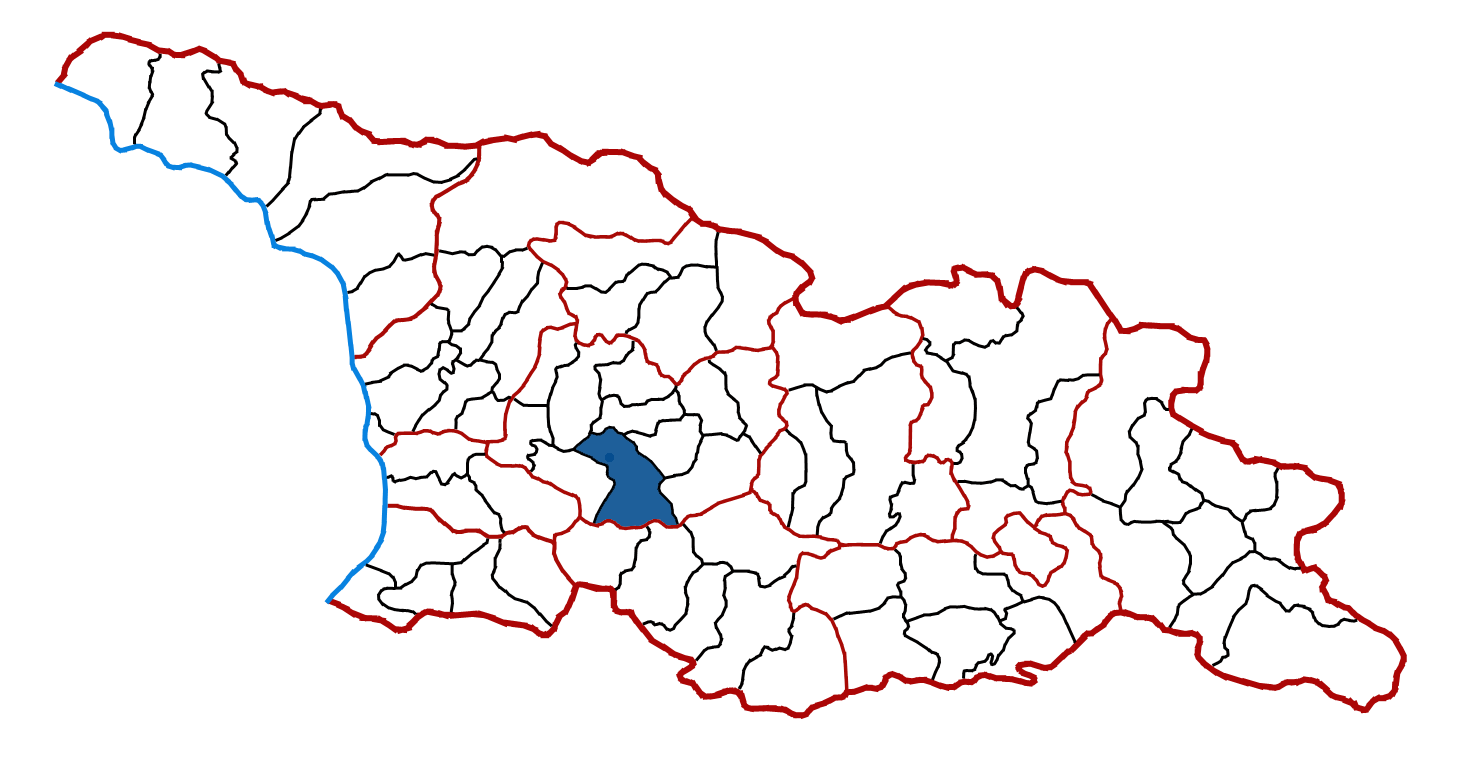
- Location of the municipality within Georgia
- Country: Georgia
- Region: Imereti
- Capital: Baghdati

Government
  - Type: Mayor–Council
  - Mayor: Kakha Enukidze (GD)
  - Municipal Assembly: 27 members: • Georgian Dream (18); • UNM (7); • For Georgia (1); • Lelo for Georgia (1)

Area
  - Total: 815 km^{2} (315 sq mi)

Population (2014)
  - Total: 21 582
  - Density: 26.5/km^{2} (69/sq mi)

Population by ethnicity
  - Georgians: 99,7 %
  - Russians: 0,15 %
  - Ukrainians: 0,07 %
- Time zone: UTC+4 (Georgian Standard Time)
- Website: https://www.baghdati.gov.ge/

Baghdati (Georgian: ბაღდათის მუნიციპალიტეტი) is a district of Georgia, in the region of Imereti. Its main town is Baghdati. It has a population of 21 582 (2014 census) and an area of 815 km^{2} (315 sq mi). In Baghdati municipality there is one city and 25 villages. The center of the municipality is 25 kilometers away from the city of Kutaisi

== Etymology ==
According to one version, the name Baghdati is derived from the Old Persian language. Its correct form is Baghdad. On April 14, 1940, in Baghdad 10 years after the death of Vladimir Mayakovsky, Baghdad was changed as an administrative unit and renamed Mayakovsky, which it held until the late 1990s. it was later reinstated to his old name.

== History ==
According to the available data, the name Baghdati is first mentioned in historical sources in the early 18th century. It was here that the fortress of Baghdad was built by the ottomans. Earlier, this place was called Tkhmeli Castle. The oldest place in the territory of Baghdati municipality is the village of Dimi, where the first king of Georgia, Parnavaz established a supervisory fortification building.

== Politics ==
Baghdati Municipal Assembly (Georgian: ბაღდათის საკრებულო) is a representative body in Baghdati Municipality, consisting of 27 members and elected every four years. The last election was held in October 2021.

| Party | 2017 | 2021 | Current Municipal Assembly |
|---|---|---|---|
| Georgian Dream | 23 | 18 | |
| United National Movement | 3 | 7 | |
| For Georgia | | 1 | |
| Lelo | | 1 | |
| European Georgia | 2 | | |
| Alliance of Patriots | 1 | | |
| Total | 29 | 27 | |

== Notable natives ==
Many famous people were born in Baghdad, among whom are especially noteworthy: the founder of Russian avant-garde, famous artist, actor, screenwriter and playwright Vladimir Mayakovsky, composer Rezo Laghidze, academician Albert Tavkhelidze, Director Rezo Chkheidze, professor of psychiatry and musician Zurab Chikovani, conductor Jansug Kakhidze, writer and critic Jansug Gvinjilia, poet Zaal Ebanoidze, academician in the field of metallurgy Guram Kashakashvili and others.

== Gallery ==
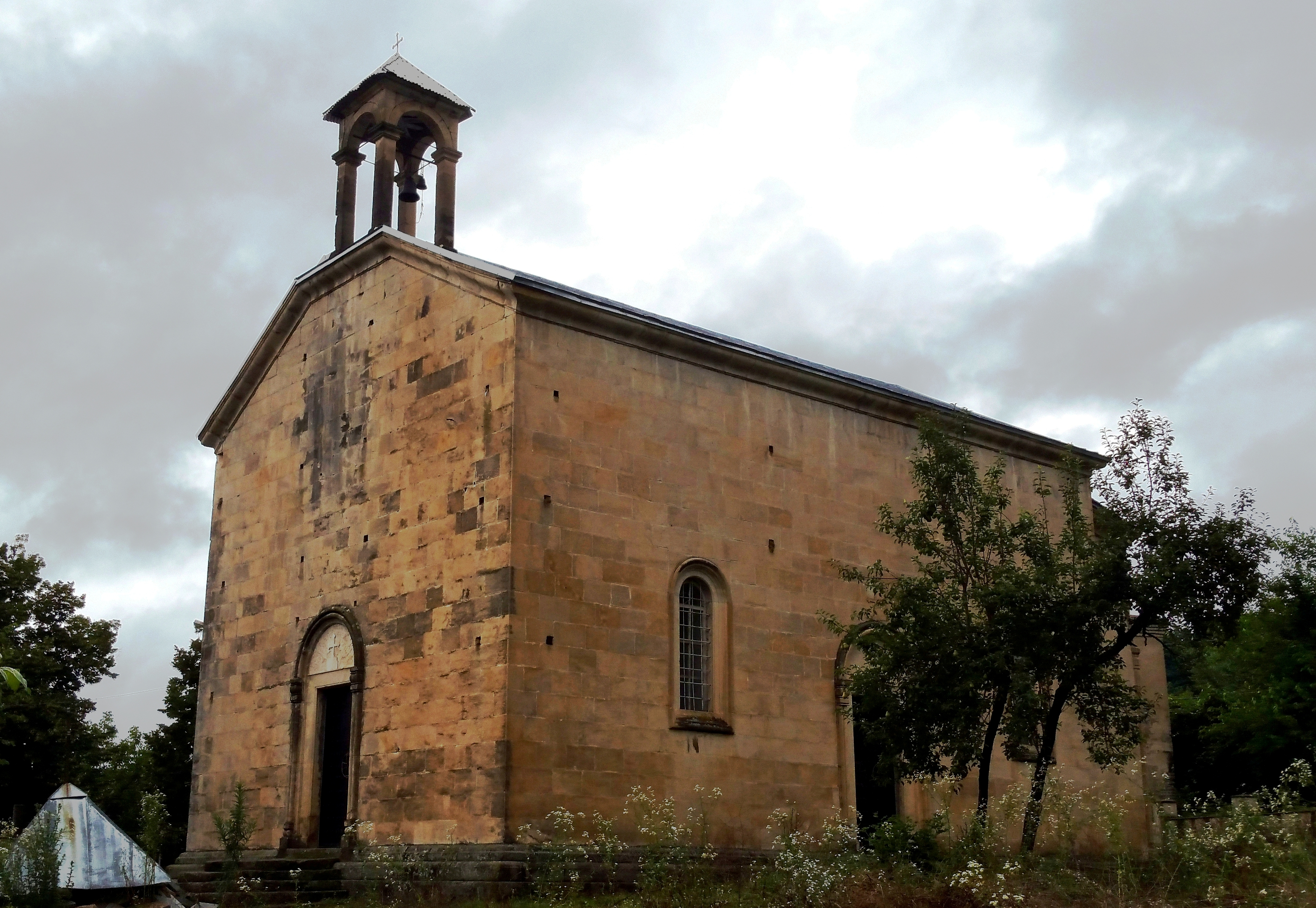
Chalis eklesia

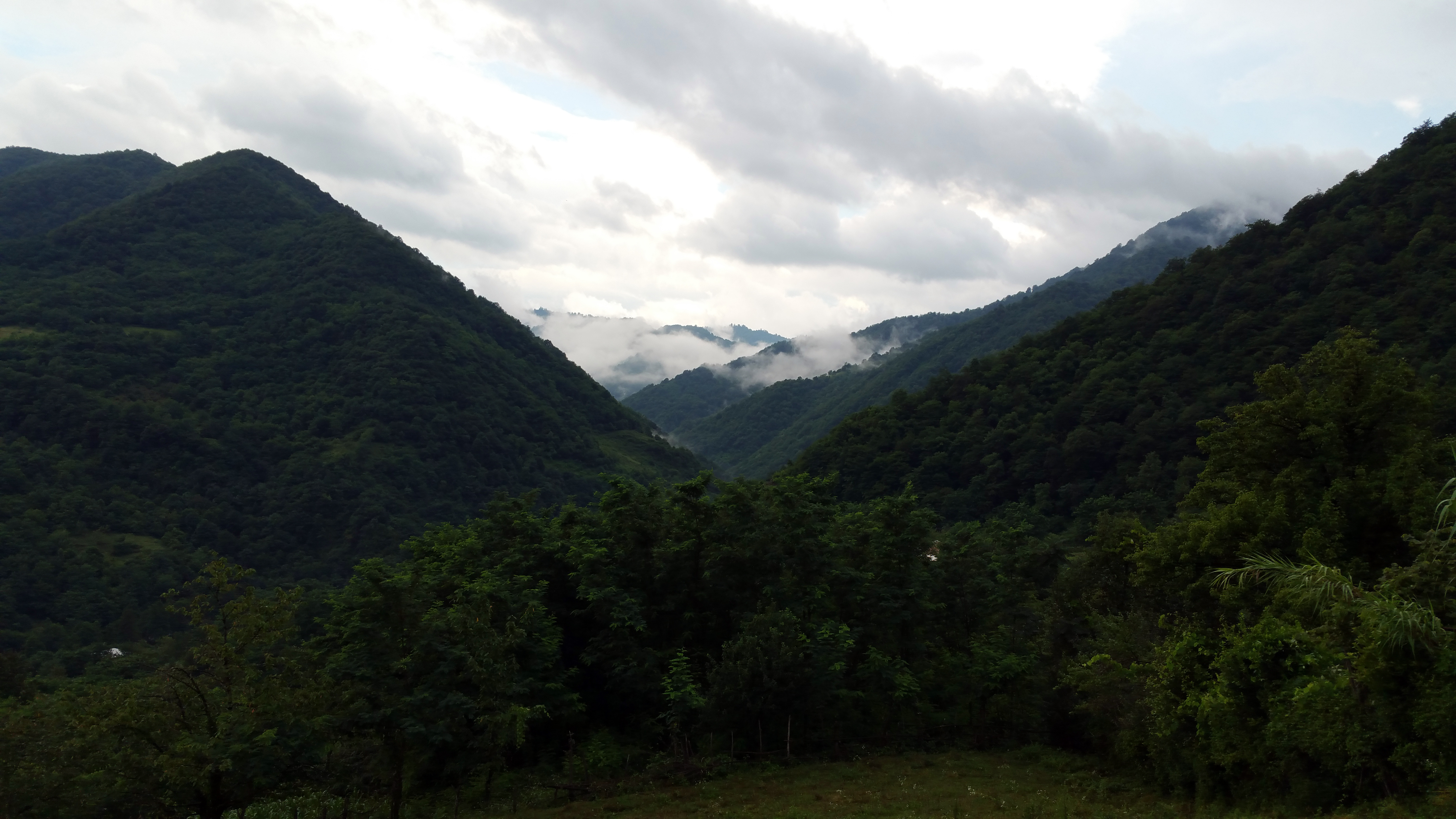
Tsitelkhevi mountains

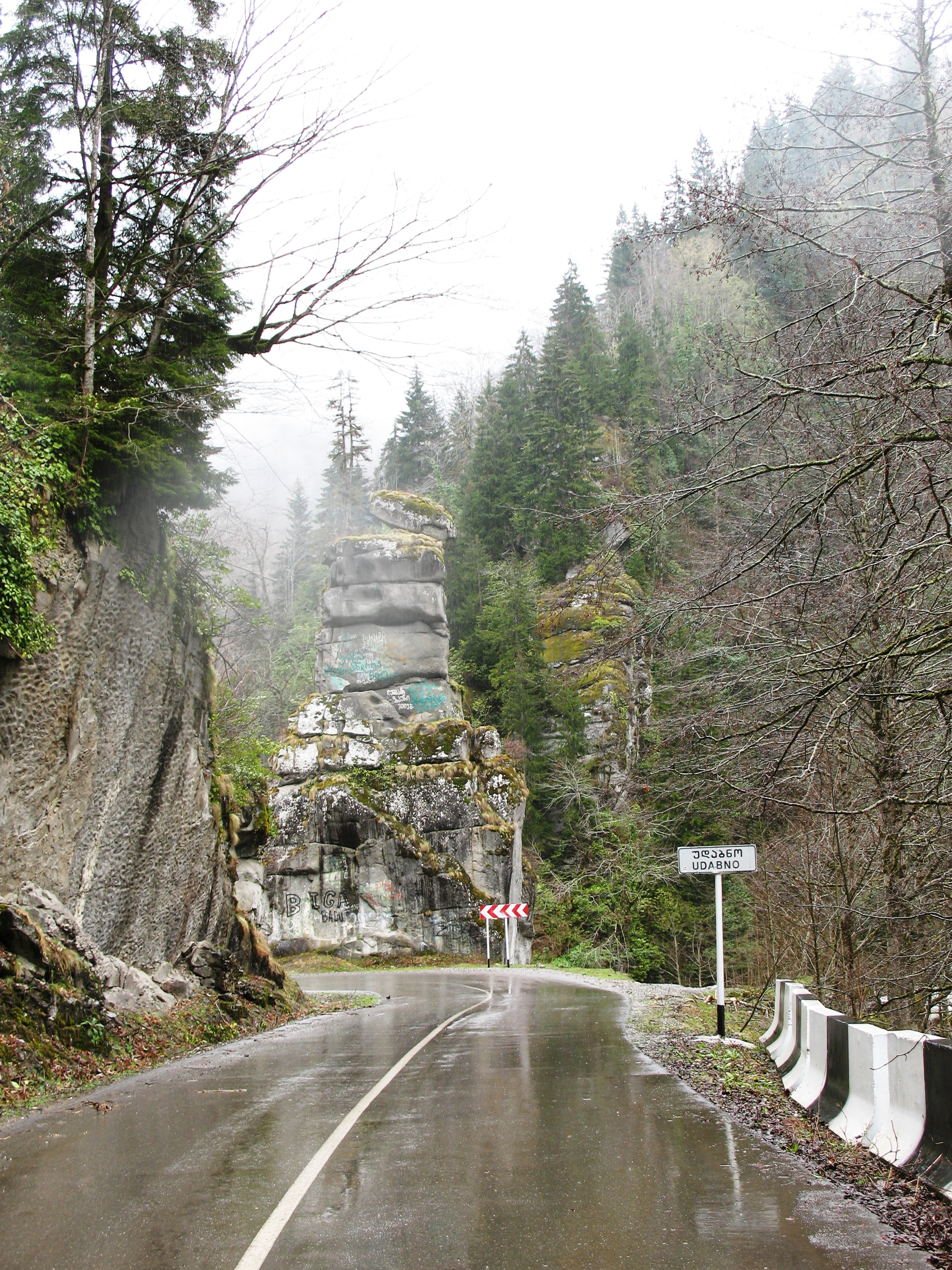
Stone Column

The river Khanistsqali

== See also ==
- List of municipalities in Georgia (country)
