= Phasis (town) =

Ancient and medieval city in Georgia

Coordinates: 42.1500°N 41.6667°E

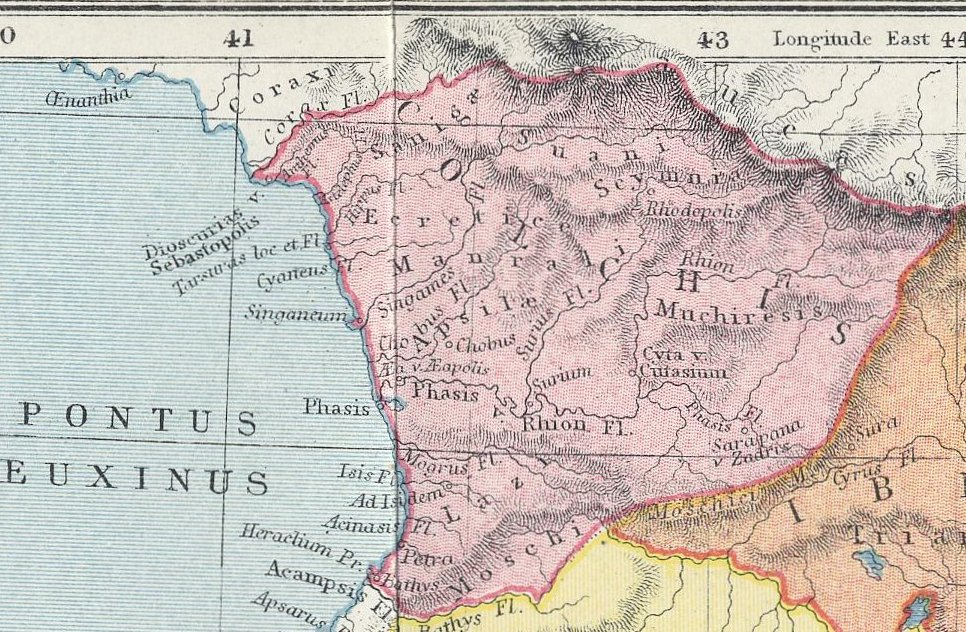
A fragment of the 1907 map of the ancient Caucasus showing the Colchis region

Phasis (Ancient Greek: Φᾶσις; Georgian: ფაზისი, pazisi) was an ancient and early medieval city on the eastern Black Sea coast, founded in the 7th or 6th century BC as a colony of the Milesian Greeks at the mouth of the eponymous river in Colchis. Its location today could be the port city of Poti, Georgia. Its ancient bishopric became a Latin Catholic titular see of Metropolitan rank.

== Etymology ==
The names of ancient Phasis and modern Poti are apparently linked to each other, but the etymology is a matter of a scholarly dispute. "Phasis" is first recorded in Hesiod's Theogony (c. 700 BC) as a name of the river, not a town. The first Greek settlement here must have been founded not earlier than the very end of the 7th, and probably at the beginning of the 6th century BC, and received its name from the river.

Since Erich Diehl, in 1938, first suggested a non-Hellenic origin of the name and that Phasis might have been a derivative of a local hydronym, several explanations have been proposed, linking the name to the Proto-Georgian-Zan language *Poti, Svan, *Pasid, and even to a Semitic word, meaning "a gold river." The collective use of the ethnonym Φασιανοί (Phasians) is attested in Xenophon and Heraclides Lembus.

The name Phasis is the origin of the word pheasant.

== History ==
Phasis appears in numerous Classical and early medieval sources as well as the Greek mythology, particularly an Argonautic cycle. Phasis is reported by Heraclides, Pomponius Mela and Stephanus of Byzantium to have been founded by Milesians. Phasis is referred to as a polis Hellenis in the Periplus of Pseudo-Scylax and Hippocrates calls it an emporion, "a trading place". According to the classical sources, Phasis had its constitution, including the Aristotelian corpus of 158 politeiai.

Phasis was probably a mixed Hellenic–"barbarian" city, in which the Greek settlers coexisted peacefully with the natives. It seems to have been a vital component of the presumed trade route from India to the Black Sea, attested by the Classical authors Strabo and Pliny.

During the Third Mithridatic War, Phasis came under Roman control. It was where the Roman commander-in-chief Pompey, having crossed into Colchis from Iberia, met the legate Servilius, the admiral of his Euxine fleet in 65 BC.

During the Lazic War between the Eastern Roman and Sassanid Iranian empires (542–562), the Persian army besieged the town, but failed to take it. After the introduction of Christianity, Phasis was the see of a Greek diocese one of whose bishops, Cyrus, became a Patriarch of Alexandria between AD 630 and 641.

== Search for Phasis ==
Despite the seemingly numerous references to the location of Phasis in the sources, the exact spot has not yet been identified. The search for the city has a long history, beginning with the French traveler Jean Chardin, who visited Georgia in the 1670s and unsuccessfully tried to find evidence of the ancient Greek polis at the mouth of the Phasis (Rioni) river. The first attempt at a scientific identification, based on an analysis of the Classical and Byzantine authors and his own fieldwork, belongs to the Swiss scholar Frédéric Dubois de Montpéreux, who traveled to the area between 1831 and 1834.

Dubois's principal conclusion—shared by modern mainstream scholarship—was that, owing to the geomorphologic changes of this locale, Phasis should be sought to the east of modern Poti, and that the ancient city was at various times at different places. Following Dubois, the majority of scholars have identified the fortress described by the ancient Greek scholar Arrian with the ruins called by locals Najikhuri, literally meaning "the site of a former fortress". It had been exploited as one of the principal reference points. However, by the time the Georgian scholars Otar Lordkipanidze and Teimuraz Mikeladze began full-scale archaeological studies of the area early in the 1960s, these ruins had already been demolished by the Soviet authorities during the construction of an airfield between 1959 and 1960.

After many years of uncertainty and academic debate, the site of this settlement now seems to be established, through a combination of surface, systematic and underwater archaeological research. Apparently the lake which Strabo reported as bounding one side of Phasis has now engulfed it, or part of it. Yet, a series of questions regarding the town's exact location and identification of its ruins remains open due largely to the centuries-long geomorphologic processes of the area as the lower reaches of the Rioni are prone to changes of course across the wetland. Agathias (c. AD 536-582/594) also allude to a nearby lake now identified with Lake Paliastomi, which has been a scene of several underwater archeological expeditions. The 18th-century Georgian scholar Prince Vakhushti of Kartli accords with this evidence, reporting that "to the south of Poti, close to the sea, is the large lake Paliastomi. Its canal enters the sea. Ships enter from here and anchor to rest in the lake. […] It is said there was once a city here, at present under water."

== See also ==
- Phasis (titular see)
