= Khanistsqali =

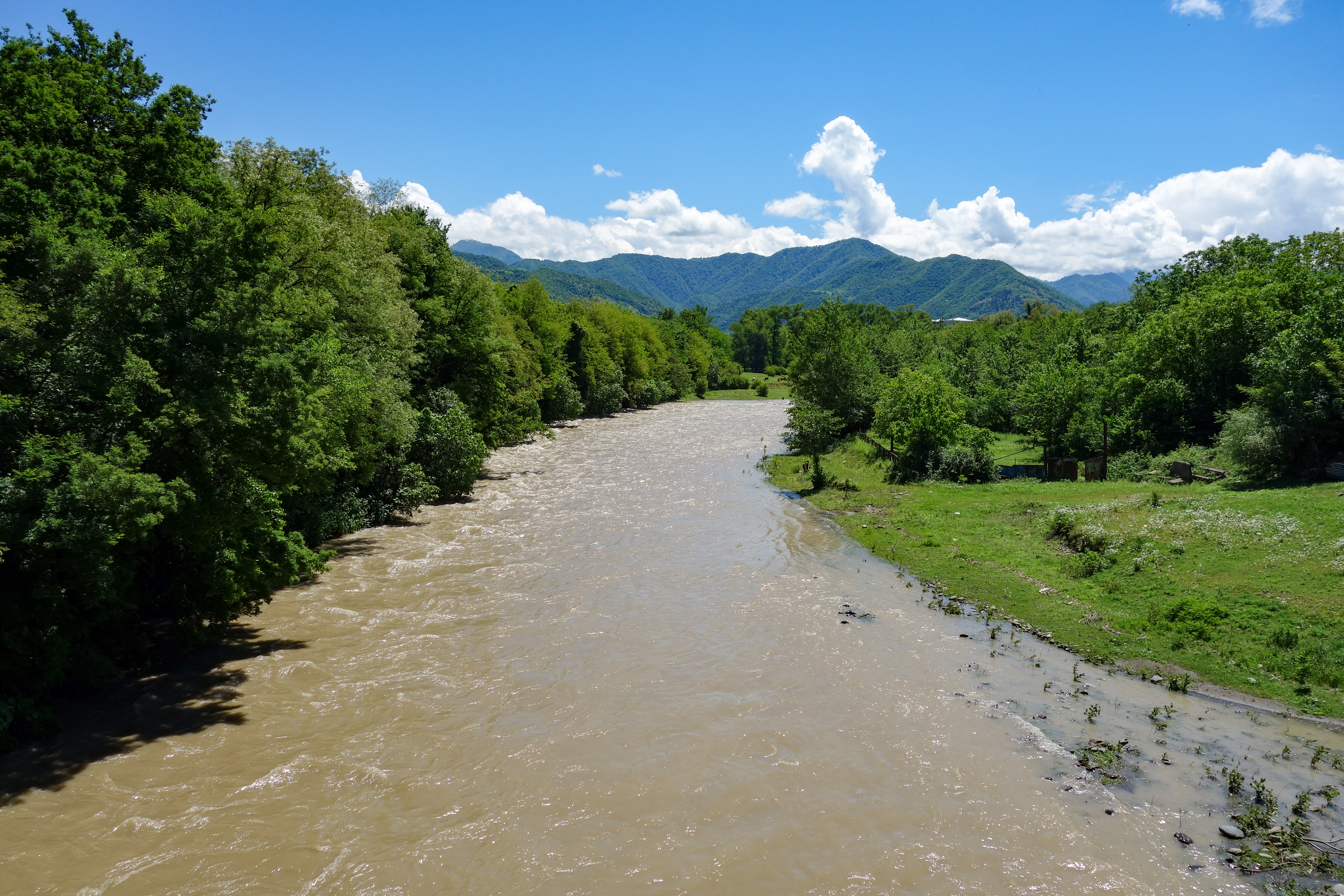
- The Khanistsqali in the village of Dimi
- Native name: ხანისწყალი (Georgian)

Location
- Country: Georgia

Physical characteristics
- Mouth: Rioni
  - coordinates: 42.1539°N 42.7120°E
- Length: 57 km (35 mi)
- Basin size: 914 km^{2} (353 sq mi)

Basin features
- Progression: Rioni→ Black Sea

The Khanistsqali (Georgian: ხანისწყალი [χän̪is̪t͡sʼχʼäli]) is a river of Georgia. It is 57 km (35 mi) long, and has a drainage basin of 914 km^{2} (353 sq mi). It is a right tributary of the Rioni. It flows through Baghdati, and joins the Rioni at Vartsikhe, south of the city Kutaisi.
