= Siege of Urbinus =

Siege during Justinian's Gothic War

Siege of Urbinus (538)
- Part of the Gothic War (535–554)
- First phase of the Gothic War campaigns
Date	Mid-summer or autumn – December 538 AD
Location	Urbinus (modern-day Urbino), Italy 43°43′35″N 12°38′11″E
Result	Byzantine victory

Belligerents
Byzantine Empire	Ostrogothic kingdom

Commanders and leaders
Belisarius; Narses (Note: Participated in the first phase of the siege.); John	Moras (surrendered)

Strength
Unknown under Belisarius; 7,000 under Narses	500 garrison size; 2,000 reinforcements

The siege of Urbinus, also called the siege of Urbino or siege of Urbinum, took place in 538 during the Gothic War when the Ostrogoths (Goths) surrendered the town to Byzantine forces.

The Byzantine general Belisarius aimed to secure key strongholds in central Italy before advancing against the Gothic capital Ravenna, but tensions within the Byzantine command had grown after the capture of Ariminum. During the siege of Urbinus, Chamberlain Narses and military commander John the Sanguinary began acting without regard for Belisarius's authority and withdrew their troops when negotiations with the Gothic garrison failed. Despite the setback, Belisarius employed conventional siege tactics, including the construction of siege engines, but just before the Byzantine forces stormed the walls, the defenders surrendered because the only stream supplying the town with fresh water had dried up. Despite the success, the Byzantine leadership remained divided, resulting in the destruction of Milan the following year.

== Prelude ==
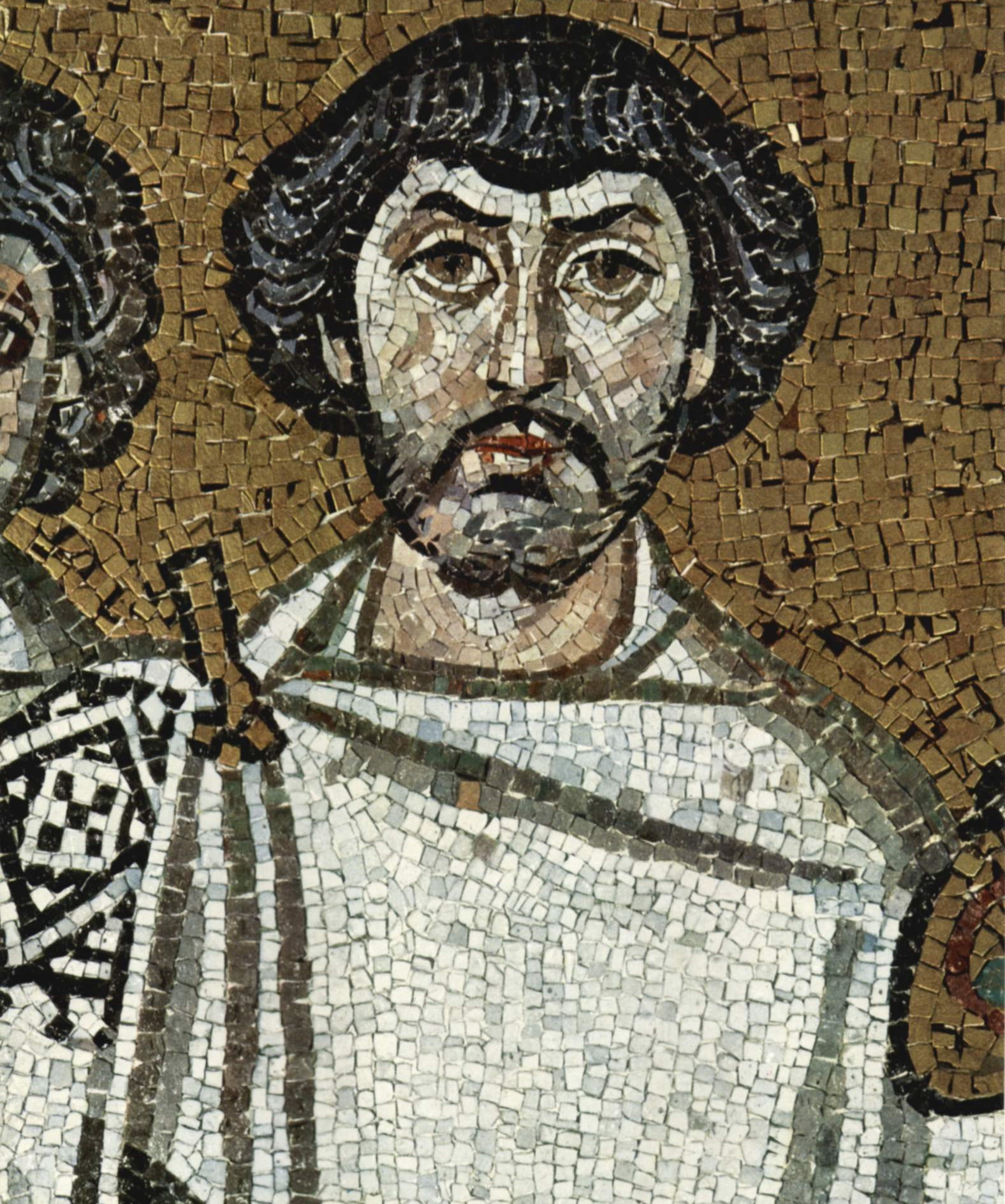
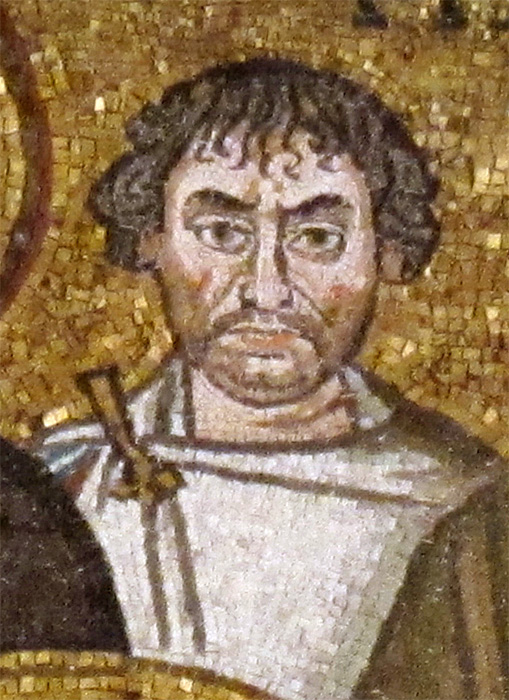
Mosaics, 6th century, depicting Belisarius (left) and Narses (right), from the Basilica of San Vitale, Ravenna, Italy

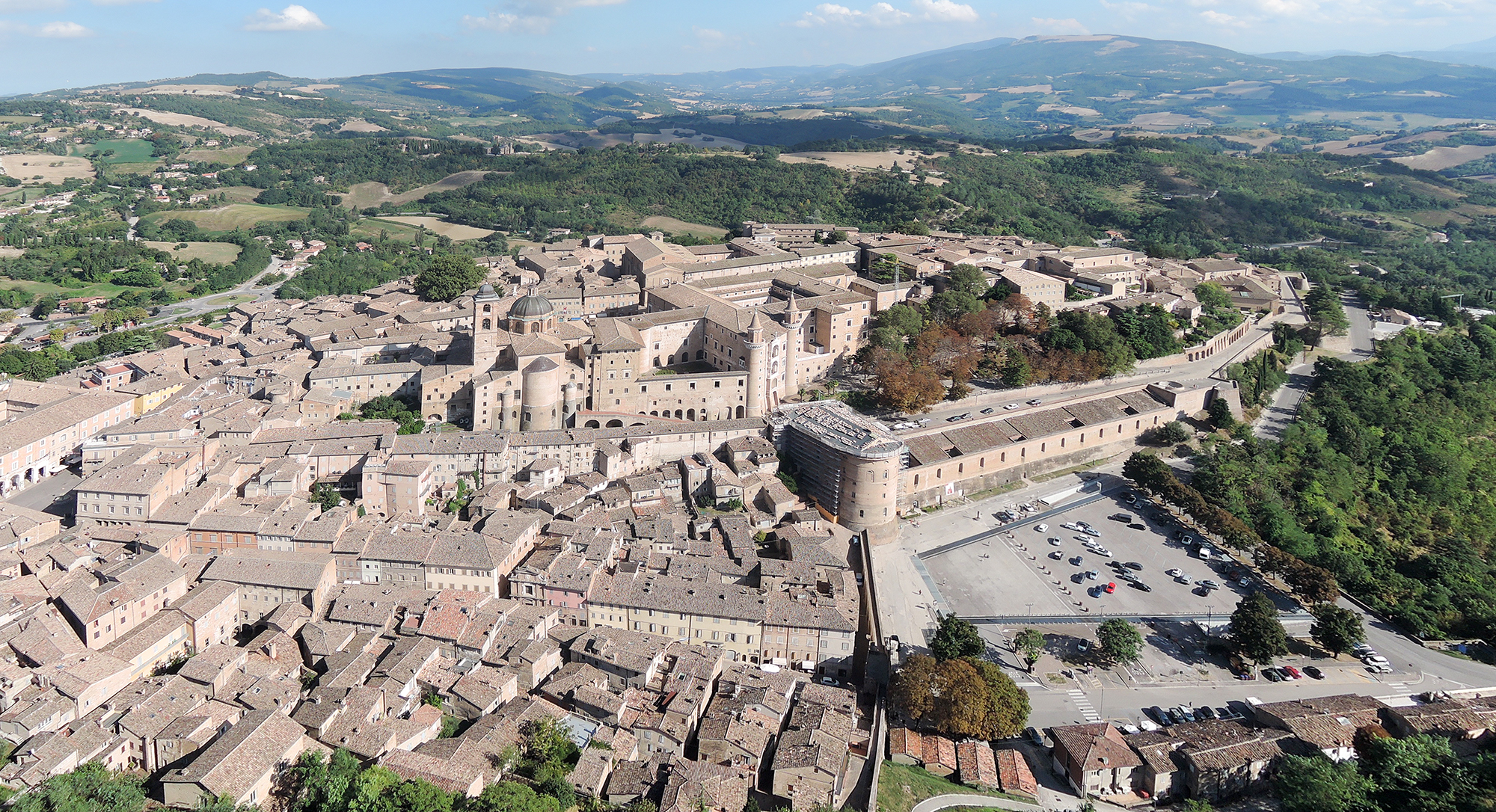
Modern-day Urbino as seen from a kite, capturing the topography of the area

In 535 AD, Byzantine Emperor Justinian I launched a campaign to conquer the Italian cities that were under the control of the Ostrogothic Kingdom. His generals, Belisarius, Mundus and Constantinianus, had made swift gains, conquering Sicily, the southern Italian Peninsula, regions of Dalmatia and Liburnia.

Following the capture of Naples, Belisarius entered Rome in December 536, prompting the king of the Goths, Vitiges, to march with an army that had superior numbers to besiege the city; contemporary historian Procopius claimed a Gothic force of 150,000 (Note: The size of the army is plausible as it represented a national army in which all male Goths were required to serve in the army.. The historian J. B. Bury considered it an exaggeration. Leif Petersen proposed an army size of 25,000–30,000 for besieging Rome, but considers Procopius's number to be a reasonable estimate of the total Gothic army in all their territories and navy. Roy Boss argued for a 40,000 strong Gothic army.) During the siege, the Goths attacked the Aurelian Walls several times, countered by Belisarius's defensive preparations, use of artillery, and cavalry sorties that exploited the Goths' difficulties in countering mounted archers. Both sides suffered from shortages and disease, but Byzantine control of sea supply routes gradually weakened the Goths, who had problems supplying their large army by land.

The siege failed because Belisarius sent John the Sanguinary along with a cavalry detachment to raid the Picenum region. John ignored the fortified towns of Auximus and Urbinus, and instead captured the city of Ariminum. The loss of Ariminum led Vitigis to lift the siege of Rome and to recover Ariminum, due to its strategic location, a day's march from Ravenna, the capital of the Gothic kingdom. Vitiges also reinforced nearby towns under his rule, sending a Gothic commander called Moras with 2,000 troops to defend the fortified town of Urbinus and Albilas with 1,000 men to Urviventus. Belisarius sought to replace John's cavalry with infantry, but John refused to obey. Soon after this, the Goths besieged Ariminum and trapped John inside the town. Belisarius joined forces with Chamberlain Narses, who had arrived with reinforcements from Constantinople. John's insubordination divided the Byzantine leadership into two factions: Belisarius and his supporters on one side, and Narses, who supported John, on the other. Belisarius was convinced by Narses to rescue John despite his insubordination.

Even with the reinforcements, Belisarius wanted to avoid a battle with the numerically superior Gothic forces, and devised a plan incorporating psychological warfare tactics. He divided his forces into three detachments and advanced on Ariminum from different directions, deliberately leaving one escape route open. Additional campfires were lit to deceive the enemy about the size of the Byzantine army. Alarmed by what they believed to be a massive force, the Goths withdrew towards Ravenna, and in July 538, Belisarius entered the town. After the victory, John refused to acknowledge Belisarius and instead credited Narses, who had convinced Belisarius to intervene. From this point on, Narses and John challenged Belisarius's leadership and began to act independently of his command.

To prevent divisions within the Byzantine forces, Belisarius showed Narses the letter of appointment by the Emperor Justinian, stating Narses was his subordinate and as such he should follow his command "in the best interests of the state". Narses disregarded the letter because, in his view, Belisarius was not acting in the best interests of the state.

== Siege ==
In 538, Belisarius split his forces to besiege Urbinus and Urviventus. The town of Urbinus stood on a round, steep hill, which made any attempt to take it by force more challenging. Upon arrival at Urbinus, Belisarius's army set up camp at the east side of the town. The forces under Narses and John joined him in the siege. They set up camp on the west side of the town, undermining Belisarius's authority.

Belisarius sent envoys offering the garrison a chance to surrender. The envoys stood in front of the city gates, as they were not allowed to enter, and negotiated with the Gothic garrison. The Goths refused the offer as they were confident of their position and the abundance of their provisions. After negotiations failed, John declared the city could not be taken, and Narses agreed with him. During the night, they abandoned the siege and moved to Ariminum despite pleas from Belisarius.

The following morning, the Goth soldiers taunted Belisarius for losing half of the army. Belisarius started preparing to assault the town with the construction of siege engines and a colonnade (vinea in Roman parlance). As the Byzantines were preparing for the assault, the spring that supplied the town with fresh water suddenly failed, which disturbed the Gothic garrison. When the Byzantine troops advanced to assault the city, the Goths appeared on the walls and surrendered to Belisarius. The surrender took place in mid-December 538.

== Aftermath ==
Belisarius accepted the surrender of the Goths as subjects of the emperor and equal to the Byzantine soldiers, which, according to historian Ilkka Syvänne, meant Belisarius recruited 2,500 Goths into his army. Astonished by such success, Narses sent John to capture Caesena, but this assault failed. John then moved to and captured Forocornelius. After the siege of Urbinus, Belisarius moved to support the siege of Urviventus, which was captured shortly after.

Despite sporadic success, the divided Byzantine forces became ineffective, leading to the loss of the city of Mediolanum (modern-day Milan) to the Goths in early 539. Procopius recorded that the Goths executed 300,000 men, their women sold to Burgundians, and the city was razed to the ground. Justinian recalled Narses to Constantinople, leaving Belisarius in command of the Byzantine forces in Italy.

== Sources ==
=== Primary ===
- Procopius (1924) [545–553 AD]. Procopius: History of the Wars, Books VI and VII. Translated by Dewing, Henry Bronson. Cambridge, MA: Harvard University Press. OCLC 491843455.

=== Secondary ===
- Bury, John Bagnell (1958). History of the Later Roman Empire: From the Death of Theodosius I to the Death of Justinian. Vol. 2. Mineola, New York: Dover Publications, Inc. OCLC 1240424678.
- Hughes, Ian (2009). Belisarius: The Last Roman General. Yardley, PA: Westholme Publishing. ISBN 978-1-59-416085-1. OCLC 294885267.
- Parnell, David A. (2015). "The social networks of Justinian's generals" (PDF). Journal of Late Antiquity. 8 (1): 114–135.
- Petersen, Leif Inge Ree (2013). Siege Warfare and Military Organization in the Successor States (400–800 AD): Byzantium, the West and Islam. Leiden: Brill. ISBN 978-90-04-25446-6. OCLC 859744803.
- Syvänne, Ilkka (2021). Military History of Late Rome 518–565. Yorkshire, PA: Pen and Sword Military. ISBN 978-1-47-389530-0. OCLC 1251765729.
