= Rouphinianai =

Coastal town of ancient Bithynia

Coordinates: 40°57′52″N 29°04′07″E

Rouphinianai (Ancient Greek: Ρουφινιαναί), also known as Drys (Ancient Greek: Δρῦς), was a coastal town of ancient Bithynia located on the road from Libyssa to Chalcedon (Kadıköy) on the north coast of the Propontis. Its church was reportedly saved by Nicaean emperor John III Vatatzes. Its site is located near modern day Caddebostan, in Istanbul.

== History ==
=== Origins and name ===
The early history of Drys (Greek for "oak") is uncertain. It was probably a minor fishing village on the Marmara shore, set in wooded land near the capital. Some scholars, including Charles Texier and Raymond Janin, link the name to a notable oak tree, while Bilge Umar has proposed that it is an Anatolian toponym (Adra/Odra) that was Hellenized. The settlement may date to the reign of Theodosius I (379–395) and certainly existed by the early 5th century, when it hosted the Synod of the Oak of 403, attended by thirty-nine bishops under Theophilus of Alexandria.

=== Rufinus and the foundation ===
The settlement was renamed Ruphinianus after Flavius Rufinus, praetorian prefect under the young Arcadius. Of humble Gascon origin, Rufinus rose to become magister officiorum (388–392), consul (392) and chief commander (394), and was baptized in 394. According to the sources, he amassed wealth through confiscations, including from Arians, and used it to build a villa, a church and a monastery. He hoped to marry his daughter to Arcadius, but Eutropius arranged the emperor's marriage to Eudoxia in 396. Rufinus was killed by mercenaries in Constantinople on 27 November 395 at the instigation of Stilicho. Arcadius confiscated his estate, and the villa became an imperial residence known as Basileia.

=== Peak in the 5th century ===
Thanks to regular imperial summer use and secure trade, Ruphinianus flourished in the 5th century. Theodosius II visited periodically and, on 4 September 431, received there the eastern bishops' delegation from the Council of Ephesus. Arcadius's daughters Pulcheria, Arcadia and Marina stayed there in 444–448. The monk Hypatios settled in the ruined monastery around 400, became its abbot in 406, and died there in 446.

=== Decline in the 6th century ===
The site lost its imperial status in the 6th century, as Justin I favored the Sophianae palace (Çengelköy) and Justinian and Theodora used Hiera (Fenerbahçe). The estate passed to Belisarius; his wife Antonina reportedly lured John the Cappadocian there to incriminate him.

=== Invasions of the 7th and 8th centuries ===
Persian forces under Khosrow II reached Chalcedon in 605 and probably used the villa as a camp, damaging it. Further sieges followed in 626–629, 674 and 716–717. During the last, Maslama's fleet of some 1,800 ships dispersed into harbours on the northern Marmara coast, probably including Ruphinianus. The residents likely fled, the buildings were left in ruins, and the settlement probably reverted to a fishing village.

=== Revival in the 10th and 11th centuries ===
Constantine VII Porphyrogennetos demolished the decayed villa and built a larger summer palace. He also restored the monastery, as did Patriarch Theophylaktos in 950. In spring 1078, Nikephoros III Botaneiates stayed at the palace with his troops while preparing his march on the capital, the last major use of the site.

=== Final decline ===
After the early 12th century, the sources fall silent. The Fourth Crusade (1203–1204) left extramural settlements unprotected and abandoned. The monks left the monastery between 1215 and 1225, and it was attached to other foundations before disappearing from the record in the mid-13th century. Turkish raids in Bithynia, the Byzantine defeat at Pelekanon (1329) and the peace talks at nearby Merdivenköy led Byzantium to cede its Asian suburbs to the Ottomans, and the site fell into ruin.

=== Afterlife ===
According to Petrus Gyllius, who was in Istanbul in 1544–1550, the surviving palace remains were demolished and the stone shipped across the Bosphorus for the Süleymaniye Complex. Together with modern development, this explains why so little survives.
