= Siege of Naples (536) =

Siege during Justinian's Gothic War

- Part of the Gothic War (535–554)
- First phase of Gothic War campaigns
Date	October–November 536 AD
Location	Naples, Italy 40°50′09″N 14°14′55″E
Result	Byzantine victory
Territorial changes	Byzantines captured Naples

Belligerents
Byzantine Empire	Ostrogothic Kingdom

Commanders and leaders
Belisarius	Unknown

Strength
8,000	Minimum 800 Goths (Note: This is the number of captives at the end of the siege, suggesting that the number might be larger.); Unknown local militia
- Location within Campania Siege of Naples (536) (Italy) Siege of Naples (536) (Mediterranean)

The siege of Naples or siege of Neapolis took place in October–November 536, where Byzantines captured the city controlled by the Ostrogoths (Goths) during the Gothic War (535–554).

After securing Sicily, Belisarius crossed the narrow strait to Rhegium and marched along the Italian coast toward Rome. The first resistance came in Naples, where its citizens chose to resist, encouraged by pro-Gothic leaders, despite Belisarius's generous terms. The siege lasted about twenty days with significant Byzantine casualties, and Belisarius nearly called it off before the discovery of a small entrance into the city near the aqueduct. Byzantine troops widened the hole in the rock to ease access in secret. After Belisarius's final offer to surrender was rejected, his troops stormed the city during the night, where killings and looting took place. Belisarius restored order among his troops, allowing his soldiers to keep the loot and releasing all citizens of Naples. The 800-strong Gothic garrison was captured and treated well but the pro-Gothic leaders met violent ends. The fall of Naples opened the way for Belisarius to advance on Rome, which he entered unopposed on 9 December 536.

== Prelude ==
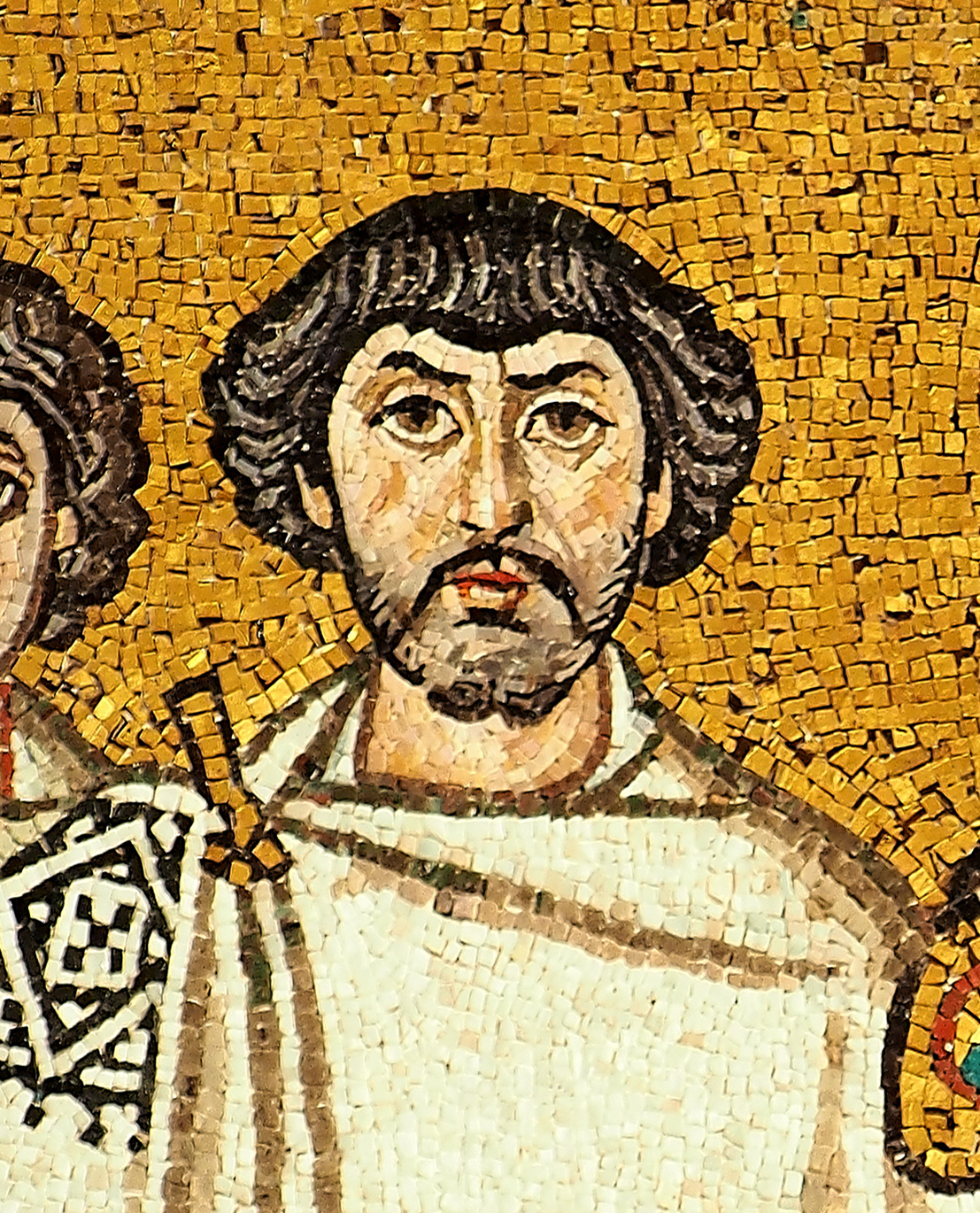
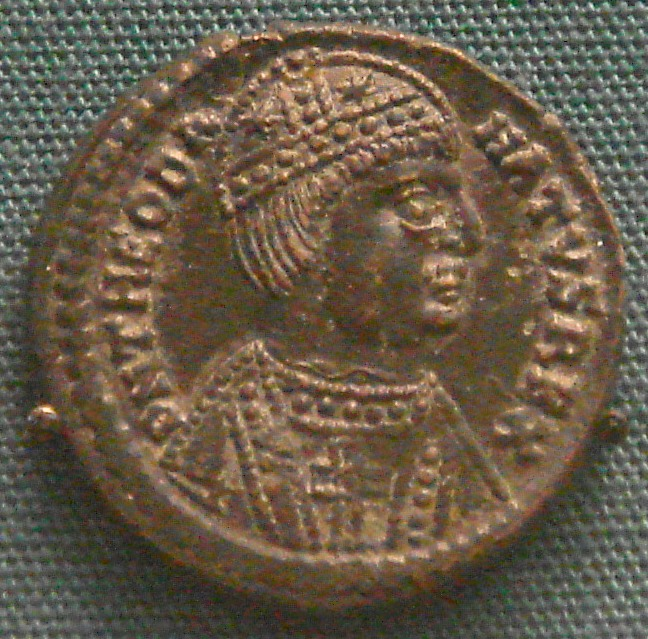
(Left) Mosaic, 6th century, depicting Belisarius, from the Basilica of San Vitale, Ravenna; (right) A coin of Theodahad (534–536), minted in Rome. He is shown wearing a barbarian's moustache

The Gothic War began as part of Byzantine Emperor Justinian's goal to restore former Western Roman territories to Byzantine control. It started with the successful reconquest of North Africa in the Vandalic War (533–534). In early 535, tensions in the Gothic kingdom escalated following the assassination of Queen Amalasuntha, who had maintained good relations with the Byzantines and even considered handing her kingdom to Justinian, further weakened by internal leadership struggles that continued under King Theodahad. Justinian used Amalasuntha's death as a diplomatic pretext for military intervention. He first dispatched Mundus to seize Salona in Dalmatia region and sent Belisarius to invade Sicily. The Goths struggled to resist these offensives, as Justinian had also secured an alliance with the Franks, who sought to expand into Gothic territories. Sicily fell under Byzantine control with the siege of Panormus being the only viable Gothic resistance.

Upon receiving orders from Justinian to invade the Italian Peninsula, Belisarius moved swiftly. Leaving garrisons at Panormus and Syracuse, he crossed the narrow strait of Messina to Rhegium and landed on mainland Italy in late spring 536. Opposing him was Ebrimuth, son-in-law of Theodahad, who had been dispatched to guard the Straits of Messina after the Byzantine capture of Sicily. Ebrimuth and his troops surrendered to Belisarius without resistance. Ebrimuth was sent to Constantinople, where he received gifts and was honored with the title of patricius.

Belisarius then advanced into southern Italy, which was undefended following Ebrimuth's defection. The towns of the region welcomed the Byzantine troops, as many disliked the Gothic rule, but even if they wished to resist, they were unable to do so due to the lack of defensive walls. Belisarius marched quickly through Bruttium, Lucania, and Campania with the fleet sailing along the coast, to reach Naples. Naples was well defended, possessing strong walls in good repair and a Gothic garrison, which was loyal to their king as he had kept their families as hostages. Belisarius needed to capture Naples quickly as his aim was to reach Rome before the upcoming winter.

== Military and diplomatic actions ==
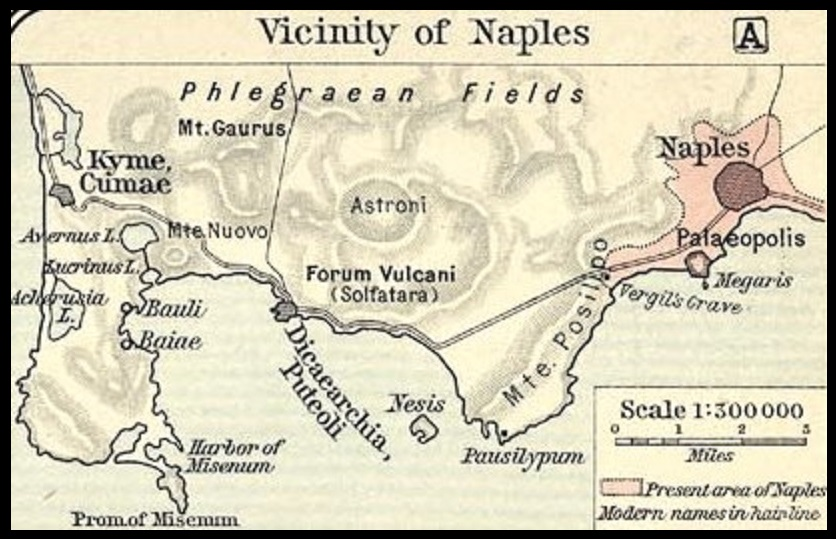
Ancient sites in the vicinity of Naples

=== Initial negotiations ===
Belisarius ordered his fleet into the harbor but kept the ships beyond the range of artillery sited on the walls. After a suburban fort surrendered, he requested that envoys from the city negotiate with him. The contemporary historian, Procopius, named three of the Gothic envoys: Stephanus, Pastor, and Asclepiodotus. The envoys argued that Naples was not important and its Gothic garrison would not surrender due to their families being hostages and suggested that the Byzantines should move north to Rome. Belisarius replied that he was not seeking their advice; instead, he promised to let the Gothic garrison depart unharmed for the city's surrender. In private, he promised Stephanus a large reward if he could inspire the citizens of Naples with goodwill towards the emperor.

Back in Naples, the pro-Gothic orators named Pastor and Asclepiodotus convinced the citizens of Naples to put forward demands which were unlikely to be accepted by Belisarius. However, he accepted every demand. A sizable majority of citizens headed to open the gates, unopposed by the Gothic garrison. However, Pastor and Asclepiodotus managed to present a convincing argument to the crowd that the Byzantines cannot guarantee the security of Naples from any Gothic retaliation and that the city's fortifications were strong enough to repel the Byzantine assaults. The orators brought the local Jews, who were attached to the Gothic rule, (Note: Jews had merchant deals with the Goths and they also feared potential persecution by the Byzantines, who were rapidly homogenizing their faithful under one religion.) to promise that there are ample supplies. The citizens eventually decided against surrendering.

=== Siege ===
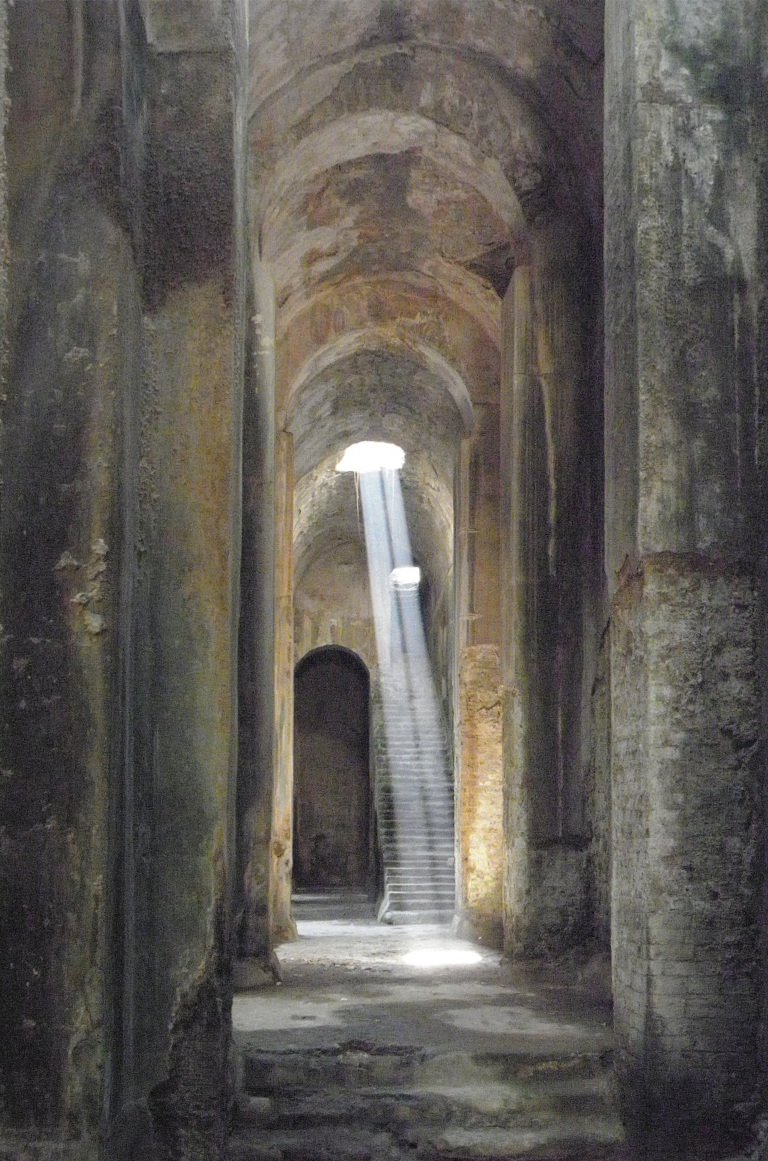
Underground aqueduct (Piscina Mirabilis) near Naples and part of regional Roman water supply, Aqua Augusta (Naples)

Belisarius attempted to take the city by direct assault from land and sea, which caused significant Byzantine losses. Historians consider that the Gothic garrison was assisted by the local population in manning the walls and the use of artillery. Despite the loss of the aqueduct leading into the city to the Byzantines, the inhabitants used the water wells in the city. They also succeeded in sending a message to Theodahad requesting relief, but he took no action to send help.

As the siege dragged on for twenty days, Belisarius was preparing to abandon the siege because his goal was to reach Rome before the winter season. An Isaurian soldier among the Byzantine troops wandered along the dry aqueduct, part of the known Aqua Augusta, to look at the workmanship of the ancient Romans and by accident, he discovered a rocky gap next to the aqueduct that could be opened to create an entrance into the city. Belisarius sent engineers to widen the hole in the aqueduct by scraping, without picks or mattocks, while sending soldiers to cover the noise of the engineers working by banging their shields together. Belisarius gave Naples a final chance to surrender, with Stephanus delivering the message. According to Procopius, he warned Stephanus that if the city were taken, the men would be killed, the women violated, the children enslaved and the buildings burned, as he would be unable to restrain the fury of his troops, many of whom were barbarians who had lost relatives before the walls. The citizens of Naples refused to surrender as they thought Belisarius was bluffing.

=== Night assault ===
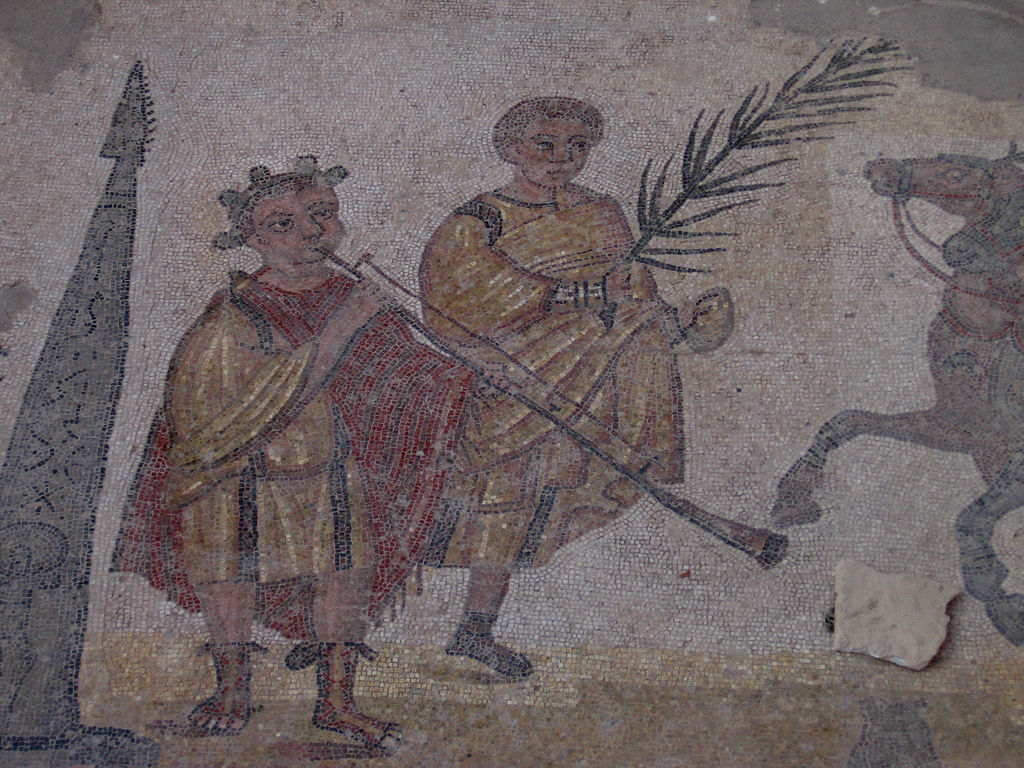
Mosaic showing the Roman tuba (sense 2) and its size in relation to its player, circa 4th century A.D. Villa Romana del Casale, Piazza Armerina, Sicily, Italy

Belisarius ordered the troops to remain awake in camp, while he positioned a detachment with ladders near the northern wall. He also sent two trumpeters and 400 men under Magnus (commander of a katalogos of cavalry) and Ennes (leader of the Isaurians) to the aqueduct. Magnus's men panicked and withdrew. Belisarius had to replace them with 200 other soldiers, after which the ashamed soldiers rejoined. He also ordered Bessas (a Byzantine commander of Gothic origin) to approach the walls and speak Gothic to distract the tower guards and mask the noise of armor and weapons of the advancing soldiers through the entrance next to the aqueduct. The Byzantines entered Naples through the hidden entrance, which was underground, covered by bricks. The soldiers reached a point where they could see a house fallen into neglect with a woman in isolation. One of the soldiers ascended using his hands and feet, and once on the surface, he threatened the woman in silence. Then he fastened to the olive tree located next to the aqueduct a strap the other end of which he threw into the aqueduct for the rest of the soldiers to ascend.

Once inside the city, the Byzantine soldiers moved to the two towers of the northern wall, where they slew their Gothic defenders. Then they used the trumpets to signal the troops to advance. The ladders were too short because the engineers had miscalculated the walls' height. Eventually, the Byzantines bound the ladders together and reached the walls and from there started taking control of the city. The citizens panicked and fled their stations while the Goths surrendered. The strongest resistance came from the Jews defending the seaward wall, who held out until sunrise. By then, all the city gates were open with the Byzantine troops entering Naples from every direction.

== Aftermath ==
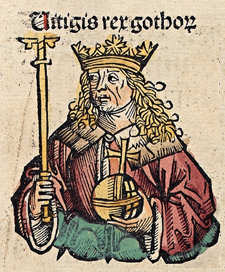
Vitigis in the Nuremberg Chronicle, 1493

The Byzantine troops, particularly the Huns, began killing and looting. Belisarius restored order, allowing his soldiers to keep the goods and to release any citizens of Naples. The Gothic garrison of 800 men was taken prisoner and treated well. Upon hearing the news that Byzantines were storming into the city, Pastor died of apoplexy, but a mob took his body and impaled it outside the city. Asclepiodotus defended himself before Belisarius and was pardoned but the people of Naples killed him after he left Belisarius's quarters. Belisarius later pardoned the citizens responsible. The exact date of Naples' fall is not known, but it was under Byzantine control by November 536.

After the fall of Naples, the Goths blamed Theodahad for failing to defend the city and turned against him. Meeting near Tarracina, they elected Vitigis, who had military experience, as their new leader. Theodahad fled toward Ravenna, the capital of the Gothic kingdom, but he was intercepted and killed by Optaris, a Goth agent acting on Vitigis's orders to bring their former king dead or alive. Theodahad had been facing threats on three fronts: the Franks in Gaul, Byzantines in the south at Naples and in the west in Dalmatia. Vitigis's plan was gather most of the scattered Gothic forces and march against one opponent at a time. Despite precautions to secure Rome, including leaving a 4,000-strong garrison and taking Roman senators as hostages, the population of Rome expelled the Gothic garrison and opened its gates to Belisarius on 9 December 536. In early 537, Vitigis besieged Rome with superior numbers, an encounter that was the highlight of the first phase of the Gothic War, in which the Byzantines were left in control of most of the Italian Peninsula.

== Sources ==
=== Primary ===
- Procopius (1914) [545–553 AD]. Procopius: History of the Wars, Books V and VI. Translated by Bronson Dewing, Henry. Cambridge, MA: Harvard University Press. OCLC 445328654.

=== Secondary ===
- Bury, John Bagnell (1958). History of the Later Roman Empire: From the Death of Theodosius I to the Death of Justinian. Vol. 2. Mineola, New York: Dover Publications, Inc. OCLC 1046522911.
- Jacobsen, Torsten C. (2009). The Gothic War, Rome's Final Conflict with the West. Yardley, PA: Westholme. ISBN 978-1-59416-084-4.
- Heather, Peter J. (2018). Rome Resurgent: War and Empire in the Age of Justinian. Oxford: Oxford University Press. ISBN 978-0-199-36274-5.
- Hughes, Ian (2009). Belisarius: The Last Roman General. Yardley, PA: Westholme Publishing. ISBN 978-1-594-16085-1.
- Mitchell, Stephen (2015). A history of the later Roman Empire, AD 284-641. Chichester, West Sussex: John Wiley & Sons. ISBN 978-1-118-31242-1.
- Syvänne, Ilkka (2021). Military History of Late Rome 518–565. Yorkshire, PA: Pen and Sword Military. ISBN 978-1-4738-9530-0.
