= Widin =

Leader of the last Ostrogothic Resistance

Widin was the last attested Ostrogothic noble in Italy. After Teia's defeat at the hands of the Byzantine eunuch general Narses at the Battle of Mons Lactarius, south of present-day Naples, in October 552 or early 553, organized Ostrogothic resistance ended. Widin, however, was able to organize a Gothic revolt in northern Italy in 561. According to Paul the Deacon, Widin comes Gothorum and Amingus, a Frank, rebelled against Narses.

Widin was captured in 562 and sent to Constantinople. After that, the Ostrogoths faded in obscurity.

== Sources ==
- Amory, Patrick (2003). People and Identity in Ostrogothic Italy, 489-554. Cambridge University Press. ISBN 0521526353.
