= Siege of Panormus =

Byzantine siege during the Gothic War (535–554)

- Part of the Gothic War (535–554)
- First phase of the Gothic War campaigns
Date	November–December 535 AD
Location	Panormus, Sicily 38°6′59″N 13°21′48″E
Result	Byzantine victory
Territorial changes	Byzantines captured Panormus

Belligerents
Byzantine Empire	Ostrogothic Kingdom

Commanders and leaders
Belisarius	Unknown

Strength
5,800 infantry; 1,700 cavalry; 7,000 bucellarii; Fleet	Unknown garrison force

The siege of Panormus or siege of Palermo took place in late 535 AD, where the Byzantine forces captured the city controlled by the Ostrogoths. It was the first engagement of the Gothic War (535–554).

Part of the Byzantine plan to reclaim the Italian Peninsula from Gothic control was to open with a sudden two-front attack, one in Dalmatia and one in Sicily. The Byzantine general Belisarius arrived in Sicily and swiftly took control of major towns due to a lack of resistance. Panormus refused to surrender because the Gothic garrison had confidence in the strength of the city's fortifications. Belisarius laid siege to the city, but did not approach by land as the defenses were strong. Instead, he noticed that the masts overtopped the parapet, and this prompted Belisarius to send the fleet into the city harbor with small boats filled with archers, hoisted at the masts, which surpassed the height of the parapet. The Goths tried to protect the walls, but they had little protection against the archers, which led to their surrender. The fall of Palermo completed the conquest of Sicily.

== Prelude ==
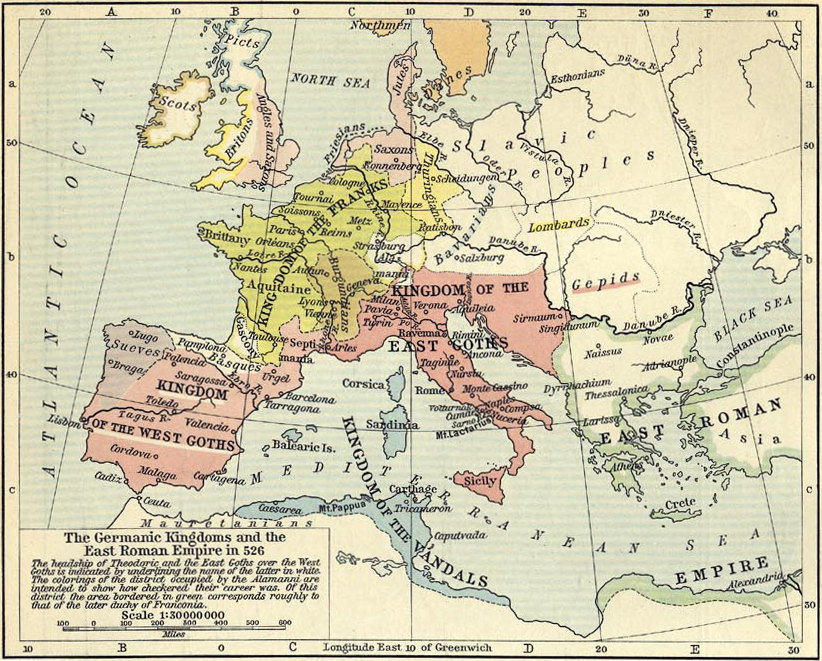
Map of the East Roman Empire (Byzantine Empire) and the Germanic kingdoms of the western Mediterranean in 526

The Gothic War began as part of Byzantine Emperor Justinian's goal to restore former Western Roman territories to Byzantine control. It started with the successful reconquest of North Africa in the Vandalic War (533–534). In early 535, tensions in the Gothic kingdom escalated following the assassination of Queen Amalasuntha, who had maintained good relations with the Byzantines and even considered handing her kingdom over to them, and were further weakened by internal leadership struggles that continued under King Theodahad. Justinian used Amalasuntha's death as a diplomatic pretext for military intervention. He first dispatched Mundus, the Magister Militum per Illyricum, to seize Salona in Dalmatia region and sent Belisarius to invade Sicily. The Goths struggled to resist these offensives, as Justinian had also secured an alliance with the Franks, who sought to expand into Gothic territories.

Contemporary Procopius, who accompanied Belisarius, listed the units of Belisarius's army. It included 4,000 regular troops (katalogoi) and foederati, about 3,000 Isaurians, 200 Hun allies, and 300 Moorish cavalry. The cavalry numbered about 1,200 under three commanders, while the infantry totaled roughly 2,800 under four commanders. Belisarius was also accompanied by his bucellarii, which was about 7,000 strong. In total, he commanded approximately 8,700 cavalry and 5,800 infantry, excluding sailors, engineers, and other support personnel.

According to historian Ilkka Syvänne, the Byzantine campaign against the Goths was originally planned to open with a surprise attack on Sicily led by Belisarius. His orders were to create the impression that his true objective was Carthage, approaching it by way of Sicily. Once he reached Sicily, he was to land his troops under a plausible pretext and attempt to seize control. If this proved impossible, he was to proceed to Carthage without revealing his true intentions. Syvänne considers that the most effective coordination would have involved Mundus and Belisarius meeting near Epidamnus before separating for their respective operations. Mundus likely waited for confirmation of Belisarius's move against Sicily, since such news could have reached him by ship within a matter of days.

== Siege ==
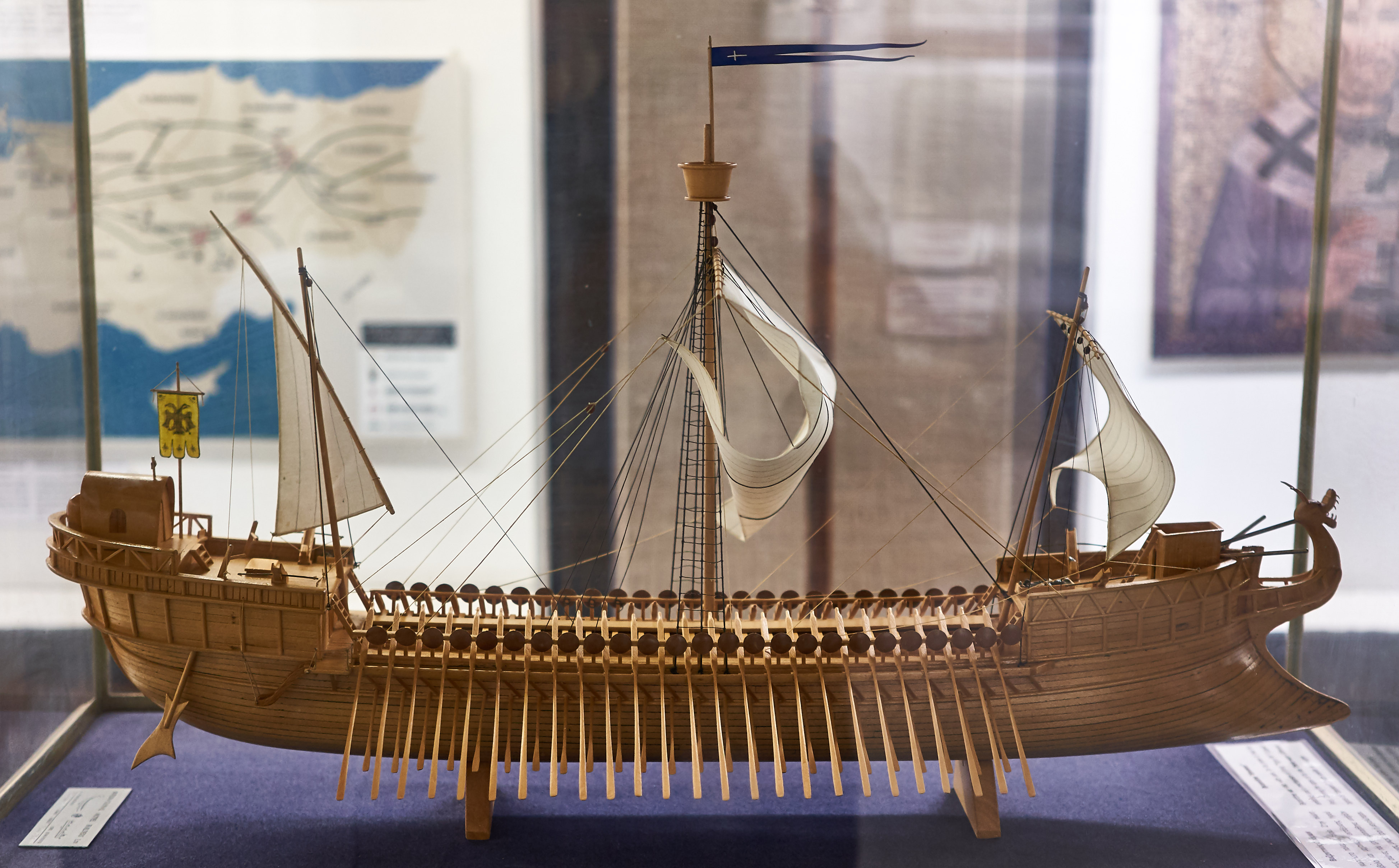
Model of a Byzantine warship (dromon) with oars, located at the Athens War Museum

Belisarius landed in Sicily and took over Catania with little trouble. He made the city his headquarters and moved onto Syracuse, which also fell without a fight. In November 535, Belisarius's army and fleet then advanced on Panormus, where he encountered resistance by the local Goth garrison.

The Goth garrison at Panormus was confident behind the protection of its walls and refused the summons to surrender. Belisarius considered a land-based siege impossible. Instead, he noticed that his ships' masts were higher than the parapet. This prompted Belisarius to send the fleet into the city harbor with small boats filled with archers hoisted at the masts. The Byzantine archers were able to fire arrows at the Goths, who now had little protection. The Gothic garrison tried to defend the walls, but they were overwhelmed and chose to surrender. Syvänne notes Belisarius's stratagem was consistent with Byzantine tactics for attacking coastal cities.

== Aftermath ==
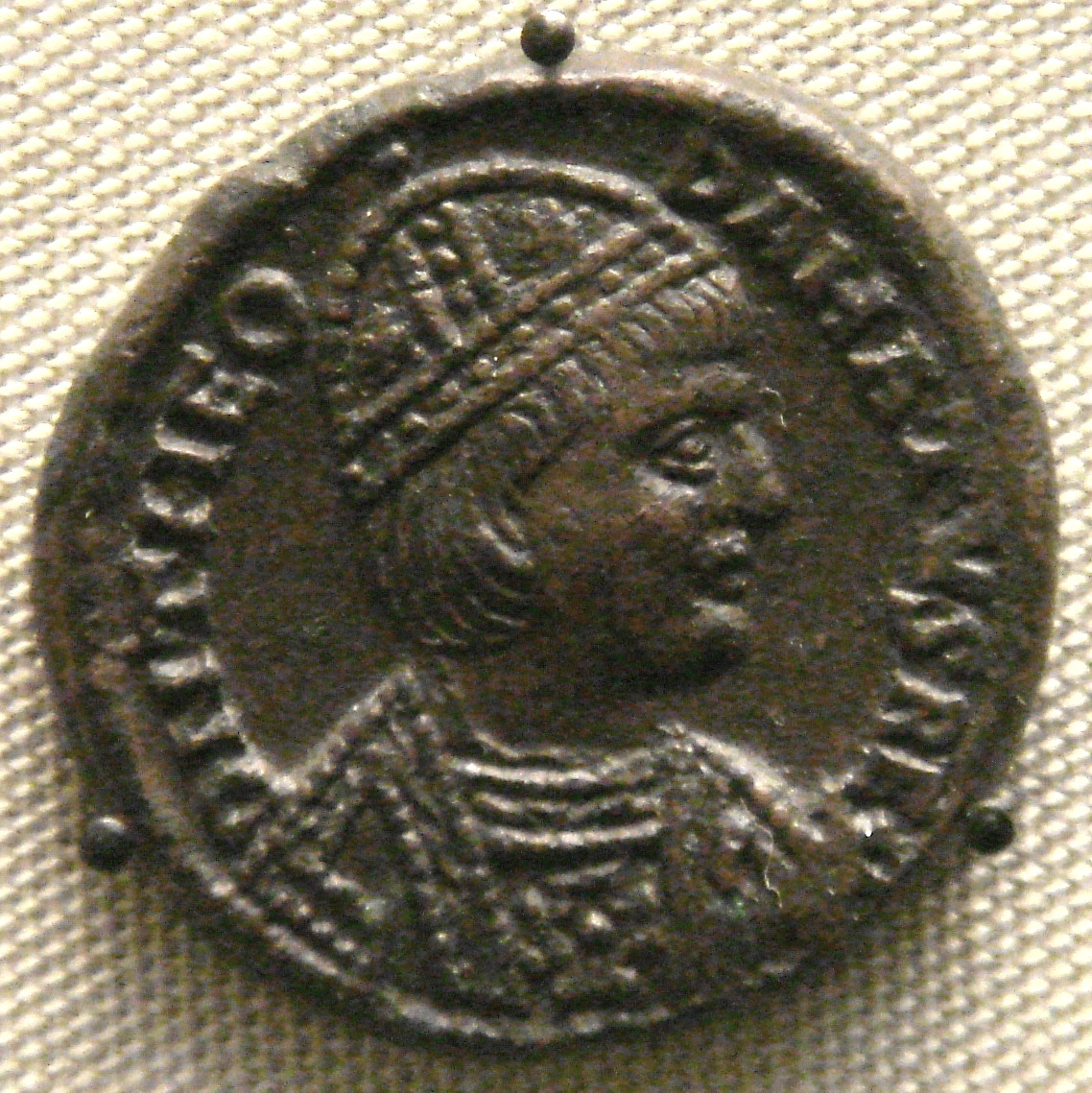
Coin of a bust of Theodahad

After capturing Panormus in December 535 and with Sicily under Byzantine control, Belisarius returned to Syracuse on 31 December 535, the last day of his consulship. He celebrated by scattering gold coins among cheering soldiers and citizens, who welcomed Byzantine rule. He spent the winter at Syracuse, quartering his troops among the local population in accordance with custom. At the same time, Solomon in Carthage likely coordinated with Belisarius by sending a fleet to Sardinia, which was an additional element to the broader reconquest of the lost Byzantine territories.

Belisarius prevented any further shipments of grain to cities on the Italian Peninsula to weaken the Goths' positions, and because he wanted to appear as the man who fed the people. According to Procopius, when Belisarius marched to Rome in the following year, his fleet carried enough grain to feed the city's population for a year.

Justinian's envoy, Peter the Illyrian, pressured Theodahad to accept the loss of Sicily, send to Justinian a gold crown, and supply 3,000 Gothic troops, effectively acknowledging Byzantine supremacy. Weak and fearing war, Theodahad agreed to abdicate. Justinian moved quickly, instructing Peter and Athanasius (another Byzantine envoy) to formalize a deal granting Theodahad the royal estates (known as patrimonium) in return for ceding Italy, while Belisarius was instructed to prepare for an advance on Ravenna. Before signing, however, Theodahad learned of a Gothic engagement in Dalmatia, which was a Pyrrhic victory for the Byzantines with the deaths of the Byzantine generals Mundus and his son, Mauricius. Regaining confidence, he reversed course, refused the agreement, and detained the envoys. Justinian responded by sending Constantinianus to reclaim Salona and ordering Belisarius to invade mainland Italy.

== See also ==
- Byzantine navy

== Sources ==
=== Primary ===
- Procopius (1914) [545–553 AD]. Procopius: History of the Wars, Books V and VI. Translated by Bronson Dewing, Henry. Cambridge, MA: Harvard University Press.

=== Secondary ===
- Bury, John Bagnell (1958). History of the Later Roman Empire: From the Death of Theodosius I to the Death of Justinian. Vol. 2. Mineola, New York: Dover Publications, Inc.
- Heather, Peter J. (2018). Rome Resurgent: War and Empire in the Age of Justinian. Oxford: Oxford University Press. ISBN 9780199362745.
- Hughes, Ian (2009). Belisarius: The Last Roman General. Yardley, PA: Westholme Publishing. ISBN 9781594160851. OCLC 294885267.
- Petersen, Leif Inge Ree (2013). Siege Warfare and Military Organization in the Successor States (400–800 AD): Byzantium, the West and Islam. Leiden & Boston: Brill. ISBN 978-90-04-25199-1.
- Syvänne, Ilkka (2021). Military History of Late Rome 518–565. Yorkshire, PA: Pen and Sword Military. ISBN 978-1-4738-9530-0.
