= Bulgarian–Serbian War =

The term Bulgarian–Serbian War or Serbian–Bulgarian War may refer to:

- Bulgarian–Serbian wars (medieval)
  - Bulgarian–Serbian War (839–842)
  - Bulgarian–Serbian War (853)
  - Bulgarian–Serbian wars (917–924)
  - Bulgarian–Serbian War (1330)
- Bulgarian–Serbian War (1885)
- Bulgarian–Serbian War (1913), during the Second Balkan War
- Bulgarian–Serbian War (1915–1918), during the First World War
  - Toplica Uprising
- Bulgarian–Serbian War (1941–1944), during the Second World War

== See also ==
- Bulgarian occupation of Serbia (disambiguation)
- Serbian Uprising (disambiguation)
- Serbian-Turkish War (disambiguation)
