= Herzegovina Uprising =

Herzegovina uprising or Herzegovinian uprising may refer to:

- Herzegovina uprising (1596–97), fought by Serbs in Herzegovina against the Ottoman Empire, 1596–1597
- Herzegovina uprising (1852–62), fought by Serbs in Herzegovina against the Ottoman Empire, 1852–1862
- Herzegovina uprising (1875–77), fought by Serbs in Herzegovina against the Ottoman Empire, 1875–1877
- Herzegovina uprising of 1882, fought by Serbs and Bosniaks in Herzegovina against Austro-Hungarian Empire, 1882
- June 1941 uprising in eastern Herzegovina, fought by Serbs in eastern Herzegovina against Ustaše in 1941

== See also ==
- Herzegovina (disambiguation)
- Herzegovinian (disambiguation)
- Uprising in Bosnia and Herzegovina (disambiguation)
- Serbian Uprising (disambiguation)
