= Bosnia and Herzegovina (disambiguation) =

Bosnia and Herzegovina is a country in the Balkans in Europe.

Bosnia and Herzegovina may also refer to

- Federation of Bosnia and Herzegovina, one of two "entities" comprising the current Bosnia and Herzegovina, the other being the Republika Srpska
- Republic of Bosnia and Herzegovina (1992–1995), predecessor of the current Bosnia and Herzegovina and successor of the Socialist Republic of Bosnia and Herzegovina; one of the parties in the Bosnian War
- Socialist Republic of Bosnia and Herzegovina (1963–1992), previously Democratic Bosnia and Herzegovina (1943–1946) and the People's Republic of Bosnia and Herzegovina (1946–1963), one of the constituents of the Socialist Federal Republic of Yugoslavia
- Province of Bosnia and Herzegovina (1918–1922), one of the Subdivisions of the Kingdom of Yugoslavia
- Province or Condominium of Bosnia and Herzegovina (1908–1918), under joint Austrian and Hungarian rule within the Austro-Hungarian Empire

== See also ==
- Herzeg-Bosnia, unrecognised Croatian state in Bosnia and Herzegovina during the Bosnian War
- Herzeg-Bosnia Canton, local name for Canton 10, one of ten cantons of the Federation of Bosnia and Herzegovina
- Party for Bosnia and Herzegovina, Bosniak nationalist political party
- Bosnia (disambiguation)
- Herzegovina (disambiguation)
