= Serbian campaign =

Campaign during World War I

- Part of Balkan campaign of World War I
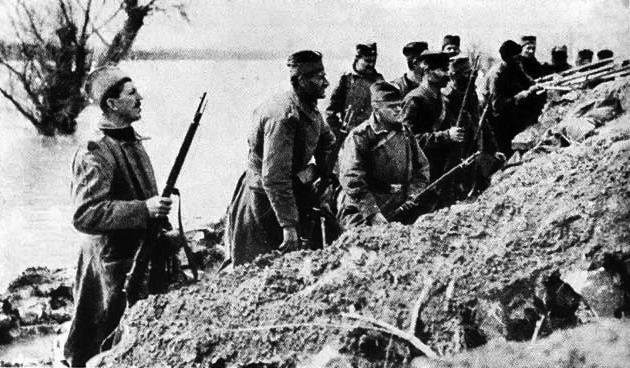
- Serbian infantry during World War I
Date	28 July 1914 – 3 November 1918
Location	Serbia, Montenegro, Albania, and Macedonia
Result	Serbian victory (1914); Central Powers victory (1915); Allied victory (1918)
Territorial changes	Dissolution of Austria-Hungary; Liberation and territorial expansion of Serbia; formation of the Kingdom of Serbs, Croats and Slovenes.

Belligerents
Allies: Kingdom of Serbia; Kingdom of Montenegro (1914–1916); Russian Empire (1914–1917); Russian Republic (1917–1918) (Russia) Russian Legion (1918); France (1915–1918); United Kingdom (1915–1918); Kingdom of Greece (1917–1918)	Central Powers: Austria-Hungary; German Empire (1915–1918); Kingdom of Bulgaria (1915–1918)

Commanders and leaders
(Kingdom of Serbia) Peter I (Kingdom of Serbia) Alexander I (Kingdom of Serbia) Radomir Putnik # (Kingdom of Serbia) Živojin Mišić (Kingdom of Serbia) Stepa Stepanović (Kingdom of Serbia) Pavle Jurišić Šturm (Kingdom of Serbia) Petar Bojović (Kingdom of Montenegro) Janko Vukotić (French Third Republic) Louis Franchet d'Espèrey	(Austria-Hungary) Franz Joseph I # (Austria-Hungary) Karl I (Austria-Hungary) Oskar Potiorek (Austria-Hungary) Stjepan Sarkotić (Austria-Hungary) Hermann Kövess von Kövessháza (German Empire) August von Mackensen (German Empire) Max von Gallwitz (Tsardom of Bulgaria (1908–1946)) Ferdinand I of Bulgaria (Tsardom of Bulgaria (1908–1946)) Nikola Zhekov (Tsardom of Bulgaria (1908–1946)) Kliment Boyadzhiev (Tsardom of Bulgaria (1908–1946)) Georgi Todorov

Casualties and losses
450,000	380,000
- 450,000 to 842,000 Serbian civilians died of war-related causes from 1914 to 1918

The Serbian campaign was a series of military expeditions launched in 1914 and 1915 by the Central Powers against the Kingdom of Serbia during World War I. After an unsuccessful invasion by Austria-Hungary in 1914, the Central Powers launched a successful invasion in 1915 and occupied Serbia. In 1918, after breaking the front in Macedonia, Serbia and its allies liberated Serbia.

The first campaign began after Austria-Hungary declared war on Serbia on 28 July 1914. The campaign, dubbed a "punitive expedition" (German: Strafexpedition) by the Austro-Hungarian leadership, was under the command of Austrian General Oskar Potiorek. It ended after three unsuccessful Austro-Hungarian invasion attempts were repelled by the Serbians and their Montenegrin allies. The victory of the Royal Serbian Army at the battle of Cer is considered the first Allied victory in World War I, and the Austro-Hungarian Army's defeat by Serbia has been called one of the great upsets of modern military history.

The second campaign was launched, under German command, almost a year later, on 6 October 1915, when Bulgarian, Austro-Hungarian, and German forces, led by Field Marshal August von Mackensen, successfully invaded Serbia from three sides, pre-empting an Allied advance from Salonica to help Serbia. This resulted in the Great Retreat through Montenegro and Albania, the evacuation to Greece, and the establishment of the Macedonian front. The defeat of Serbia gave the Central Powers temporary mastery over the Balkans, opening up a land route from Berlin to Constantinople, allowing the Germans to re-supply the Ottoman Empire for the rest of the war. Mackensen declared an end to the campaign on 24 November 1915. Serbia was then occupied and divided between the Austro-Hungarian Empire and Bulgaria.

After the Allies launched the Vardar Offensive in September 1918, which broke through the Macedonian front and defeated the Bulgarians and their German allies, a Franco-Serbian force advanced into the occupied territories and liberated Serbia, Albania, and Montenegro. Serbian forces entered Belgrade on 1 November 1918.

The Serbian army declined severely from about 420,000 at its peak to about 100,000 at the moment of liberation. The estimates of casualties are various: Original Serb sources claim that the Kingdom of Serbia lost more than 1,200,000 inhabitants during the war (including both military and civilian losses), which represented more than 29% of its overall population and 60% of its male population. More recent historical analysis has estimated that roughly 177,000 Serbian soldiers lost their lives or were not returned from captivity, while the civilian death toll is impossible to determine, numbering in the hundreds of thousands. According to estimates prepared by the Yugoslav government in 1924, Serbia lost 265,164 soldiers or 25% of all mobilized troops. By comparison, France lost 16.8%, Germany 15.4%, Russia 11.5%, and Italy 10.3%.

== Background ==
Austria-Hungary precipitated the Bosnian crisis of 1908–09 by annexing the former Ottoman territory of Bosnia and Herzegovina, which it had occupied since 1878. This angered the Kingdom of Serbia and its patron, the Pan-Slavic and Orthodox Russian Empire. Russian political manoeuvring in the region destabilized peace accords that were already unravelling in what was known as "the powder keg of Europe."

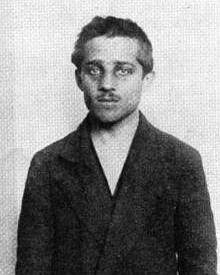
Gavrilo Princip, a member of the Young Bosnia, assassinated Archduke Franz Ferdinand, the heir to the Austro-Hungarian throne

In 1912 and 1913, the First Balkan War was fought between the Balkan League of Greece, Bulgaria, Serbia, and Montenegro and the fracturing Ottoman Empire. The resulting Treaty of London further shrank the Ottoman Empire by creating an independent Principality of Albania and enlarging the territorial holdings of Bulgaria, Serbia, Montenegro, and Greece. When Bulgaria attacked both Serbia and Greece on 16 June 1913, it lost most of its Macedonian region to those countries, and additionally, the Southern Dobruja region to Romania and Adrianople (the present-day city of Edirne) to Turkey in the 33-day Second Balkan War, which further destabilized the region.

On 28 June 1914, Gavrilo Princip, a Bosnian Serb student and member of an organization of national revolutionaries called Young Bosnia, assassinated Archduke Franz Ferdinand of Austria, the heir to the Austro-Hungarian throne, in Sarajevo, Bosnia. Although the assassination's political objective was the independence of the southern Austro-Hungarian provinces, mainly populated by Slavs, from the Austro-Hungarian Empire, it also inadvertently triggered a chain of events that embroiled Russia and the major European powers. This initiated a period of diplomatic manoeuvring among Austria-Hungary, Germany, Russia, France, and Britain known as the July Crisis. Austria-Hungary delivered the July Ultimatum to Serbia, a series of ten demands intentionally made unacceptable to provoke a war with Serbia. When Serbia agreed to only eight of the ten demands, Austria-Hungary declared war on 28 July 1914.

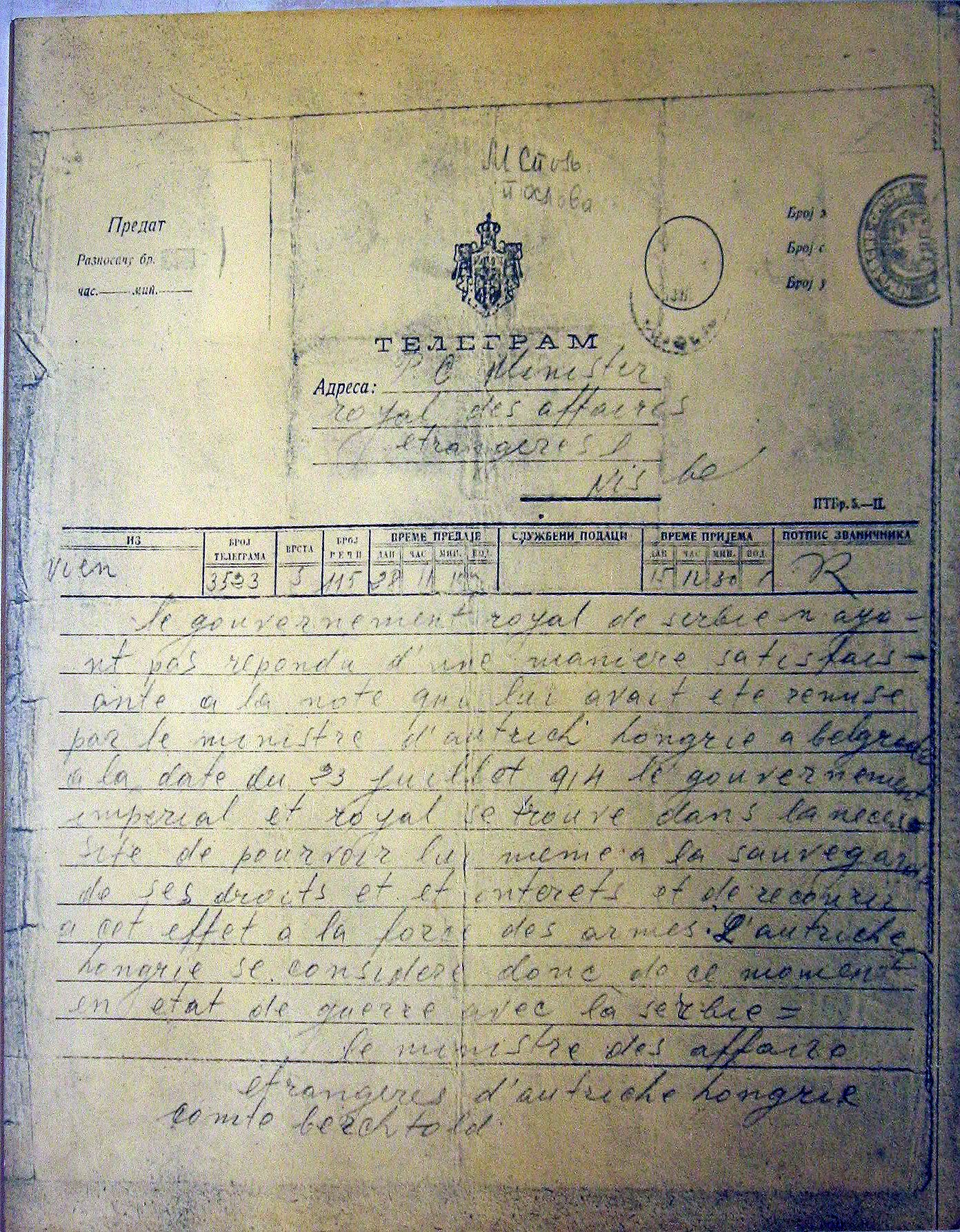
The Austro-Hungarian government's declaration of war in a telegram sent to the government of Serbia on 28 July 1914, signed by Imperial Foreign Minister Count Leopold Berchtold.

The dispute between Austria-Hungary and Serbia escalated into what is now known as World War I, drawing in Russia, Germany, France, and the British Empire. Within a week, Austria-Hungary was forced into war with Russia, Serbia's patron, which at the time had the largest army in the world. The result was that Serbia became a subsidiary front in the massive conflict that was unfolding along Austria-Hungary's border with Russia. Although Serbia had an experienced army, it was exhausted by the Balkan Wars and poorly equipped, leading the Austro-Hungarians to believe it would fall within less than a month. Serbia's strategy was to hold out as long as possible and hope that the Russians could defeat the main Austro-Hungarian Army, with or without the assistance of other allies. Serbia was constantly concerned about its hostile eastern neighbour, Bulgaria, with which it had fought several wars, most recently in the Second Balkan War of 1913.

== Military forces ==
=== Austro-Hungarian ===
The standing peacetime Austro-Hungarian army had 36,000 officers, including non-commissioned officers and 414,000 enlisted personnel. During mobilization, this number could be increased to 3,350,000 men of all ranks. The operational army had over 1,420,000 men, while another 600,000 were allocated to support and logistic units (train, munition and supply columns, etc.). The rest (around 1,350,000) were reserve troops available to replace losses and form new units. This vast military power allowed the Austro-Hungarian Army to replace its losses regularly and keep units at their formation strength. According to some sources, there were an average of 150,000 men per month during 1914 sent to replace the losses in the field army. During 1915 these numbers rose to 200,000 per month. According to the official Austrian documents in the period from September until the end of December 1914, some 160,000 replacement troops were sent to the Balkan theatre of war, as well as 82,000 reinforcements as part of newly formed units.

The prewar Austro-Hungarian plan to invade Serbia envisioned the concentration of three armies (2nd, 5th and 6th) on Serbia's western and northern borders to envelop and destroy the bulk of the Serbian army. However, with the beginning of the Russian general mobilization, the Armeeoberkommando (AOK, Austro-Hungarian Supreme Command) decided to move the 2nd army to Galicia to counter Russian forces. Due to the congestion of railroad lines towards Galicia, the 2nd Army could only start its departure on 18 August, which allowed the AOK to assign some units of the 2nd Army to take part in operations in Serbia before that date. Eventually, the AOK allowed General Oskar Potiorek to deploy a significant segment of the 2nd army (around four divisions) in fighting against Serbia, which caused a delay in the transport of these troops to the Russian front for more than a week. Furthermore, the Austro-Hungarian defeats suffered during the first invasion of Serbia forced the AOK to permanently transfer two divisions from the 2nd Army to Potiorek's force. By 12 August, Austria-Hungary had amassed over 500,000 soldiers on Serbian frontiers, including some 380,000 operational troops. However, on 16 August a significant part of the 2nd army was ordered to the Russian front, thus this number fell to some 285,000 active troops, including garrisons. Apart from land forces, Austria-Hungary also deployed its Danube River flotilla of six monitors and six patrol boats.

Many Austro-Hungarian soldiers were not of good quality. About one-quarter of them were illiterate, and most of the conscripts from the empire's subject nationalities did not speak or understand German or Hungarian. In addition, most of the soldiers — ethnic Czechs, Slovaks, Poles, Romanians and South Slavs — had linguistic and cultural links with the empire's various enemies.

=== Serbian ===
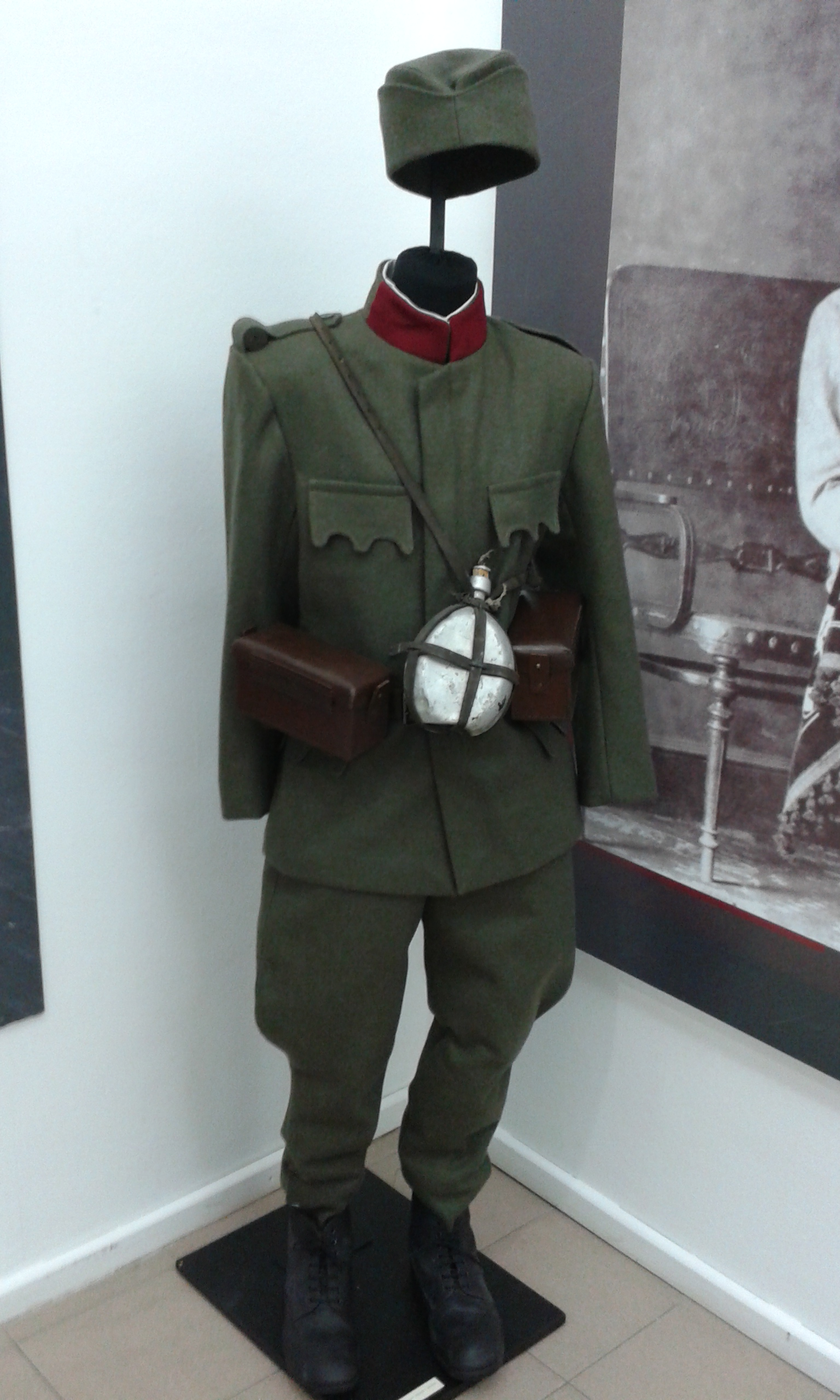
Uniform of Serbian soldiers from 1914

The Serbian military command issued orders to mobilize its armed forces on 25 July, and mobilization began the following day. By 30 July, mobilization was completed, and the troops began to be deployed according to the war plan. Deployments were completed by 9 August when the troops had arrived at their designated strategic positions. During mobilization, Serbia raised approximately 450,000 men of three age-defined classes (or bans) called poziv, which comprised all capable men between the ages of 21 and 45.

The operational army consisted of 11 1/2 infantry (six of 1st and five of the 2nd ban) and one cavalry division. Aged men of the 3rd ban were organized in 15 infantry regiments with about 45–50,000 men designated for use in rear and line of communications duties. However, some of them were by necessity used as part of the operational army as well, bringing its strength up to around 250,000 men. Serbia was in a much more disadvantageous position when compared with Austria-Hungary concerning human reserves and replacement troops, as its only source of replacements were recruits reaching the age of military enlistment. Their maximum annual number was theoretically around 60,000 and was insufficient to replace the losses of more than 132,000 sustained during operations from August to December 1914. This shortage of military power forced the Serbian army to recruit under and over-aged men to make up for losses in the opening phase of the war.

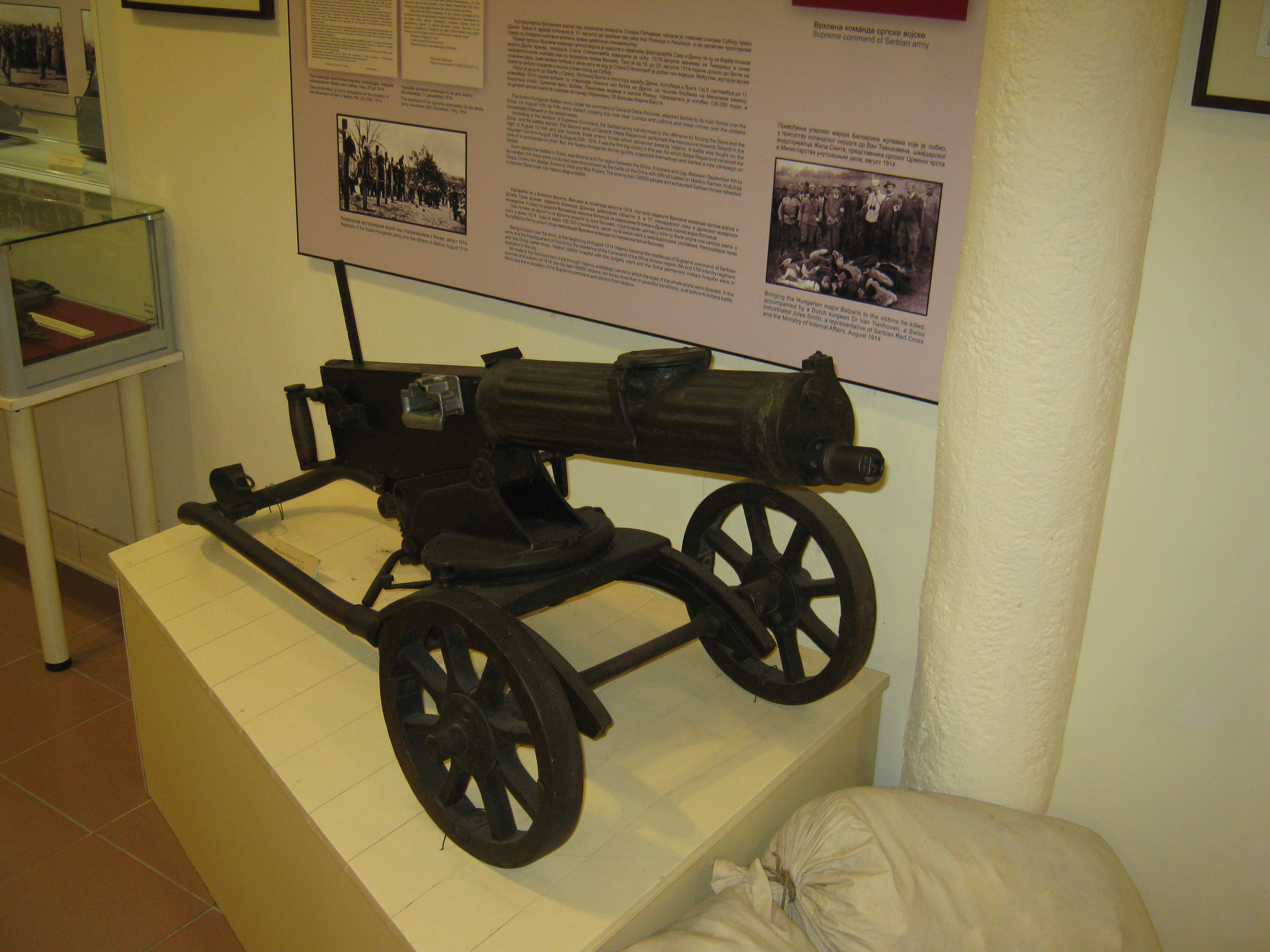
Maxim МG 10 of Serbian Royal Army

Because of the poor financial state of the Serbian economy and losses in the recent Balkan Wars, the Serbian army lacked much of the modern weaponry and equipment necessary to engage in combat with their larger and wealthier adversaries. Only 180,000 modern rifles were available for the operational army, which meant that the Serbian military lacked between one-quarter to one-third of the rifles necessary to fully equip even their front-line units, let alone reserve forces. Although Serbia tried to remedy this deficit by ordering 120,000 rifles from Russia in 1914, the weapons did not begin to arrive until the second half of August. Only 1st ban troops had complete grey-green M1908 uniforms, with 2nd ban troops often wearing the obsolete dark blue M1896 issue, and the 3rd ban had no proper uniforms at all and were reduced to wearing their civilian clothes with military greatcoats and caps. The Serbian troops did not have service issued boots at all, and the vast majority of them wore everyday footwear made of pig skin called opanak.

Ammunition reserves were also insufficient for sustained field operations as most had been used in the 1912–13 Balkan wars. Artillery ammunition was sparse and only amounted to several hundred shells per unit. Because Serbia lacked a significant domestic military-industrial complex, its army depended entirely on imports of ammunition and arms from France and Russia, which were chronically short of supplies. The inevitable shortages of ammunition later would include a complete lack of artillery ammunition, which peaked during the decisive moments of the Austro-Hungarian invasion.

=== Comparative strength ===
These figures detail the number of all Austro-Hungarian troops concentrated on the southern (Serbian) theatre of war at the beginning of August 1914 and the resources of the entire Serbian army (however, the number of troops available for the operations on both sides was somewhat less):

Type	Austro-Hungarian	Serbian
Battalions	329	209
Batteries	200	122
Squadrons	51	44
Engineer companies	50	30
Field guns	1,243	718
Machine guns	490	315
Total combatants	500,000	344,000

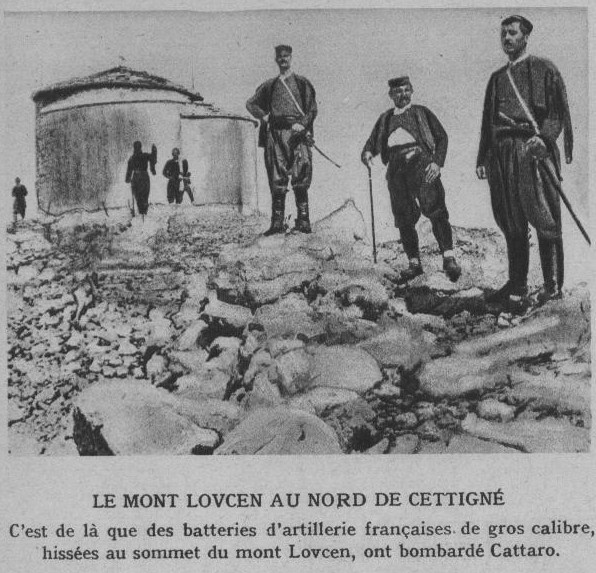
Montenegrin troops outside of Lovćen, October 1914.

Serbia's ally Montenegro mustered an army of about 45–50,000 men, with only 14 modern quick-firing field guns, 62 machine guns and some 51 older pieces (some of them antique models from the 1870s). Unlike the Austro-Hungarian and the Serbian armies, the Montenegrin army was a militia type without proper military training or a career officer's corps.

Note:

According to Austro-Hungarian military formation, the average war strength of the following units was:

- Battalion: 1000 (combatants)
- Battery: 196
- Squadron: 180
- Engineer companies: 260

The strength of corresponding Serbian units was similar:

- Battalion: 1116 (combatants and non-combatants)
- Battery: 169
- Squadron: 130
- Engineer company: 250

Heavy artillery

Austro-Hungarian	Serbian
12 mobile batteries: 4 305 mm mortars; 5 240 mm mortars; 20 150 mm howitzers; 20 120 mm cannons; Additionally, Austro-Hungarian fortresses and garrisons near the Serbian and Montenegrin borders (Petrovaradin, Sarajevo, Kotor etc.) had about 40 companies of heavy fortress artillery of various models.	13 mobile batteries: 8 150 mm mortars Schneider-Canet M97; 22 120 mm howitzers Schneider-Canet M97; 20 120 mm Schneider-Canet M1897 long gun

=== Order of battle ===
==== Serbian army ====
- First Army, commanded by general Petar Bojović; Chief of Staff colonel Božidar Terzić.
  - Cavalry division, four regiments, Colonel Branko Jovanović
  - Timok I division, four regiments, General Vladimir Kondić
  - Timok II division, three regiments
  - Morava II division, three regiments
  - Danube II division (Braničevo detachment), six regiments
  - Army artillery, colonel Božidar Srećković
- Second Army, commanded by general Stepa Stepanović; Chief of Staff colonel Vojislav Živanović
  - Morava I division, colonel Ilija Gojković, four regiments
  - Combined I division, general Mihajlo Rašić, four regiments, regiment commanders Svetislav Mišković, X, X and Dragoljub Uzunmirković
  - Šumadija I division, four regiments
  - Danube I division, colonel Milivoje Anđelković, four regiments
  - Army artillery, Colonel Vojislav Milojević
- Third Army, commanded by general Pavle Jurišić Šturm; Chief of Staff colonel Dušan Pešić
  - Drina I division, four regiments
  - Drina II division, four regiments, regiment commanders Miloje Jelisijević, X, X and X
  - Obrenovac detachment, one regiment, two battalions
  - Jadar Chetnik detachment
  - Army artillery, colonel Miloš Mihailović
- Užice Army, commanded by General Miloš Božanović
  - Šumadija II division, colonel Dragutin Milutinović, four regiments
  - Užice brigade, Colonel Ivan Pavlović, two regiments
  - Chetnik detachments, Lim, Zlatibor, and Gornjak detachments
  - Army artillery

==== Austro-Hungarian army ====
August 1914:

- Balkan force
  - 5th Army, commanded by Liborius Ritter von Frank
    - 9. infantry division
    - 21. landwehr infantry division
    - 36. infantry division
    - 42. Honvéd (Hungarian home guard) infantry division
    - 13. infantry brigade
    - 11. mountain brigade
    - 104. Landsturm infantry brigade
    - 13. march brigade
  - 6th Army, commanded by Oskar Potiorek
    - 1. infantry division
    - 48. infantry division
    - 18. infantry division
    - 47. infantry division
    - 40. Honvéd infantry division
    - 109. Landsturm infantry brigade
  - Banat Rayon and Garrisons
    - 107. Landsturm infantry brigade
    - sundry units of infantry, cavalry and artillery
- Parts of the 2nd Army, commanded by Eduard von Böhm-Ermolli
  - 17. infantry division
  - 34. infantry division
  - 31. infantry division
  - 32. infantry division, commanded by Andreas von Fail-Griessler
  - 29. infantry division
  - 7. infantry division
  - 23.infantry division
  - 10. cavalry division
  - 4. march brigade
  - 7. march brigade
  - 8. march brigade

== 1916–1918 ==
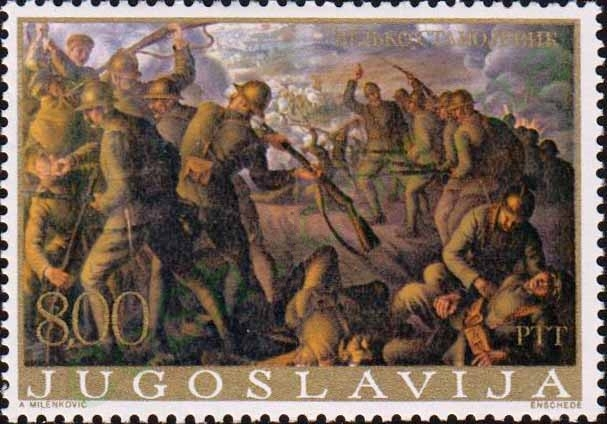
A 1976 Yugoslav postage stamp depicting the collapse of the Salonika front by war artist Veljko Stanojević

The Serbian army was evacuated to Greece and met with the Allied Army of the Orient. They then fought a trench war against the Bulgarians on the Macedonia Front, which was mainly static. French and Serbian forces re-took limited areas of Macedonia by recapturing Bitola on 19 November 1916 as a result of the costly Monastir Offensive, which brought stabilisation of the front.

French and Serbian troops finally made a breakthrough in the Vardar Offensive in 1918, after most German and Austro-Hungarian troops had withdrawn. This breakthrough was significant in defeating Bulgarian and German forces, which led to the final victory of World War I. After the Allied breakthrough, Bulgaria capitulated on 29 September 1918. Hindenburg and Ludendorff concluded that the strategic and operational balance had now shifted decidedly against the Central Powers and insisted on an immediate peace settlement during a meeting with government officials a day after the Bulgarian collapse. On 29 September 1918, the German Supreme Army Command informed Kaiser Wilhelm II and the Imperial Chancellor Count Georg von Hertling, that the military situation facing Germany was hopeless .

German Emperor Wilhelm II in his telegram to Bulgarian Tsar Ferdinand I stated: "Disgraceful! 62,000 Serbs decided the war!".

The collapse of the Macedonian front meant that the road to Budapest and Vienna was now opened for the 670,000-strong Army of General Franchet d'Esperey as the Bulgarian surrender deprived the Central Powers of the 278 infantry battalions and 1,500 guns (the equivalent of some 25 to 30 German divisions) that were previously holding the line. The German high command responded by sending only seven infantry and one cavalry division, but these forces were far from enough for a front to be re-established. In September, Entente armies spearheaded by Serbian and French troops, broke through the remaining German and Bulgarians defense, forcing Bulgaria to exit the war and liberating Serbia two weeks before the ceasefire.

=== End of the War ===
The ramifications of the war were manifold. When World War I ended, the Treaty of Neuilly awarded Western Thrace to Greece, whereas Serbia received some minor territorial concessions from Bulgaria. Austria-Hungary was broken apart, and Hungary lost much land to Yugoslavia and Romania in the Treaty of Trianon. Serbia assumed the leading position in the new Kingdom of Yugoslavia, joined by its old ally, Montenegro. Meanwhile, Italy established a quasi-protectorate over Albania, and Greece re-occupied Albania's southern part, which was autonomous under a local Greek provisional government (see Autonomous Republic of Northern Epirus), despite Albania's neutrality during the war.

=== Casualties ===
The Entente casualties

Before the war, the Kingdom of Serbia had 4,500,000 inhabitants. According to The New York Times, 150,000 people are estimated to have died in 1915 alone during the worst typhus epidemic in world history. With the aid of the American Red Cross and 44 foreign governments, the outbreak was brought under control by the end of the year. The number of civilian deaths is estimated by some sources at 650,000, primarily due to the typhus outbreak and famine, but also direct clashes with the occupiers. Serbia's casualties accounted for 8% of the total Allied military deaths. 58% of the regular Serbian Army (420,000 strong) perished during the conflict. According to the Serb sources, the total number of casualties is placed around 1,000,000: 25% of Serbia's prewar size, and an absolute majority (57%) of its overall male population. L.A. Times and N.Y. Times also cited early Serbian sources which claimed over 1,000,000 victims in their respective articles. Modern western and non-Serb historians put the casualties number either at 45,000 military deaths and 650,000 civilian deaths or 127,355 military deaths and 82,000 civilian deaths. These numbers would appear to be a low estimate, given that according to a study by Vemić of the 10 biggest concentration camps (out of more than 300) in Austria-Hungary the number of Serb dead comes to at least 59,524. Vemić indicated that the number is likely higher than 64,597 victims, as some of the camp graveyards were not fully surveyed and excavated, as well as poor record-keeping in the camps and the destruction of some of the record-keeping books in the camps. This number combines POWs and civilian casualties, as the camps were often mixed, as well as people from Serbia, Montenegro and Bosnia and Herzegovina, since they would be mixed in together in the camps.

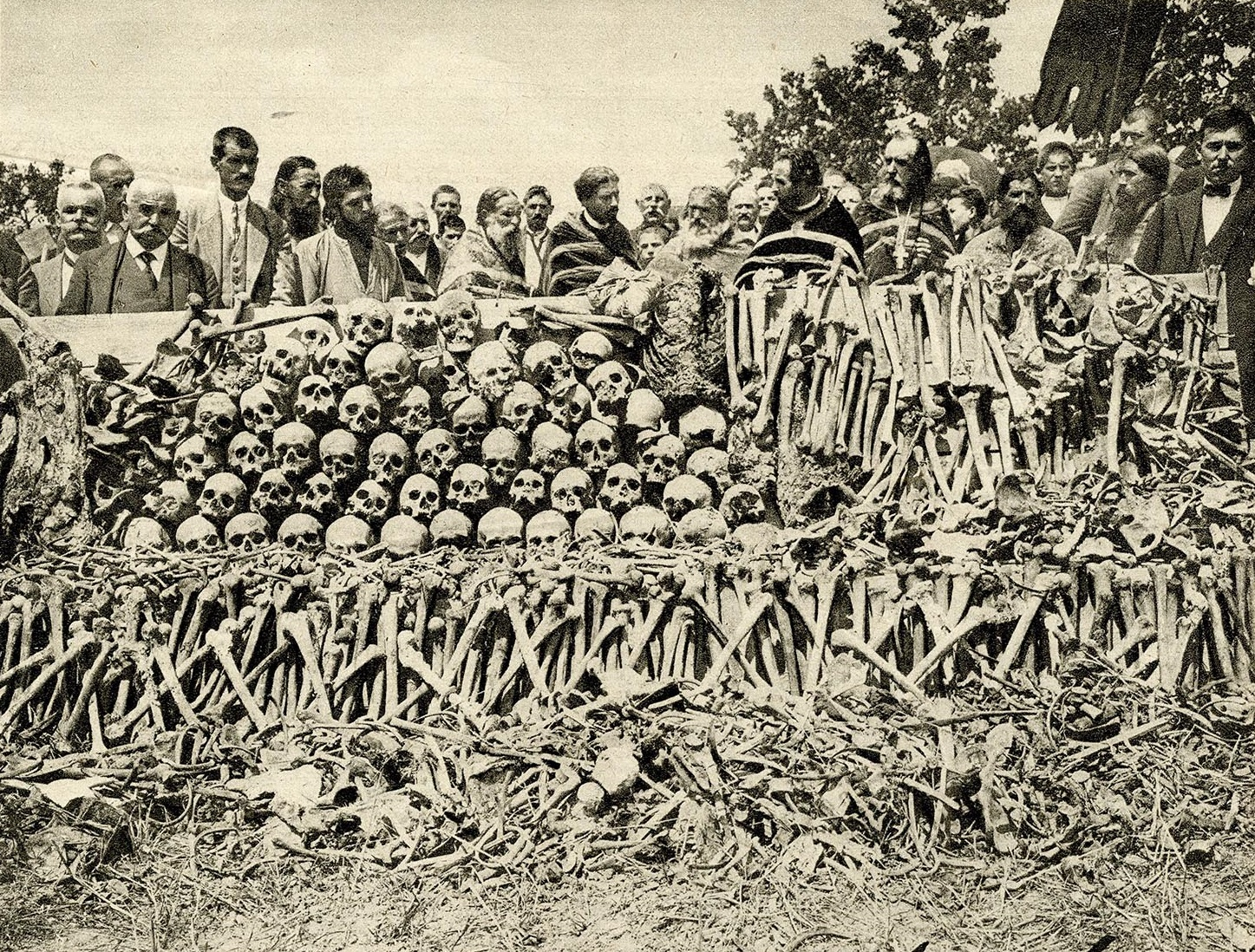
The remains of Serbs killed by Bulgarian soldiers during the Surdulica massacre. It is estimated that 2,000–3,000 Serbian men were killed in the town during the first months of the Bulgarian occupation of southern Serbia.

The extent of the Serbian demographic disaster can be illustrated by the statement of the Bulgarian Prime Minister Vasil Radoslavov: "Serbia ceased to exist" (New York Times, summer 1917). In July 1918, the U.S. Secretary of State Robert Lansing urged the Americans of all religions to pray for Serbia in their respective churches.

The Serbian army suffered a staggering number of casualties. It was significantly destroyed near the war's end, falling from about 420,000 at its peak to about 100,000 at the moment of liberation.

The Serb sources claim that the Kingdom of Serbia lost 1,100,000 inhabitants during the war. Of 4.5 million people, there were 275,000 military deaths and 450,000 among the ordinary citizenry. The civilian deaths were attributable mainly to food shortages and the effects of epidemics such as Spanish flu. In addition to the military deaths, there were 133,148 wounded. According to the Yugoslav government, in 1914, Serbia lost 365,164 soldiers, or 26% of all mobilized personnel, while France suffered 16.8%, Germany 15.4%, Russia 11.5%, and Italy 10.3%.

At the war's end, there were 114,000 disabled soldiers and 500,000 orphaned children.

=== Attacks against ethnic Serb civilians ===
The assassination in Sarajevo of Archduke Franz Ferdinand of Austria and his wife Sophie, Duchess of Hohenberg was followed by violent anti-Serb demonstrations of angry Croats and Muslims in the city during the evening of 28 June 1914 and for much of the following day. This happened because most Croats and many Muslims considered the archduke the best hope for establishing a South Slav political entity within the Habsburg Empire. The crowd directed its anger principally at shops owned by ethnic Serbs and the residences of prominent Serbs. Two ethnic Serbs were killed on 28 June by crowd violence. That night there were anti-Serb demonstrations in other parts of the Austro-Hungarian Empire.

=== War crimes and atrocities ===
Incited by anti-Serbian propaganda and collusion with the command of the Austro-Hungarian Army, soldiers committed numerous atrocities against the Serbs in both Serbia and Austria-Hungary. According to the German-Swiss criminologist and observer R.A. Reiss, it was a "system of extermination." In addition to executions of prisoners of war, civilian populations were subjected to mass murder and rape. Villages and towns were burned and looted. Fruit trees were cut down, and water wells were poisoned in an effort on the Austro-Hungarian part to discourage Serb inhabitants from ever returning.

In the Bulgarian occupation zone, the civilian population was exposed to various measures of repression, including mass internment, forced labor, and a Bulgarisation policy. The Documents relatifs aux violations des Conventions de La Haye et du Droit international, commis de 1915–1918 par les Bulgares en Serbie occupée, a report covering alleged atrocities committed in Serbia, published after the war, stated that ‘anyone unwilling to submit him or herself to the occupiers and become Bulgarian was tortured, raped, interned, and killed in particularly gruesome manners, some of which recorded photographically'. Notable atrocities include the Štip massacre and Surdulica massacre.

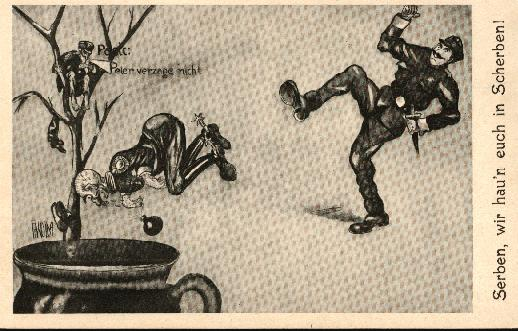
Austro-Hungarian propaganda postcard saying "Serbs, we'll smash you to pieces!"

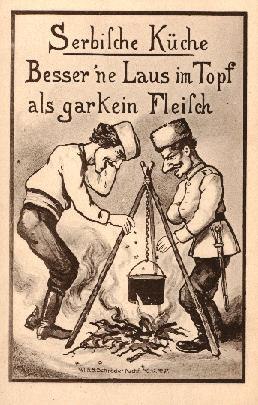
Anti-Serbian propaganda postcard

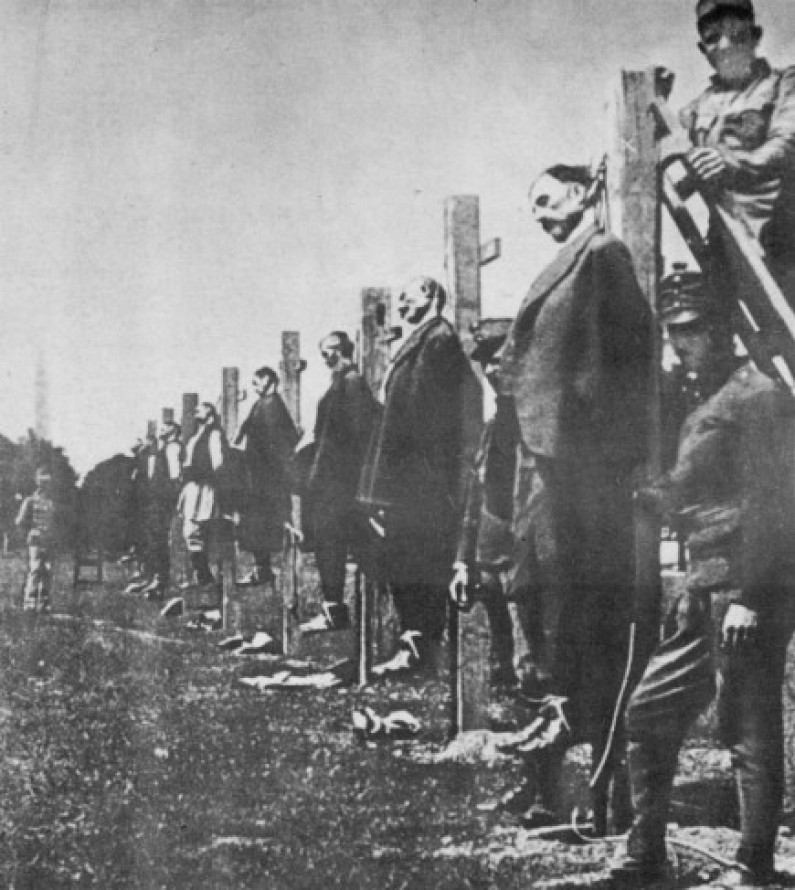
Austro-Hungarian soldiers executing Serbian civilians during World War I (1916).

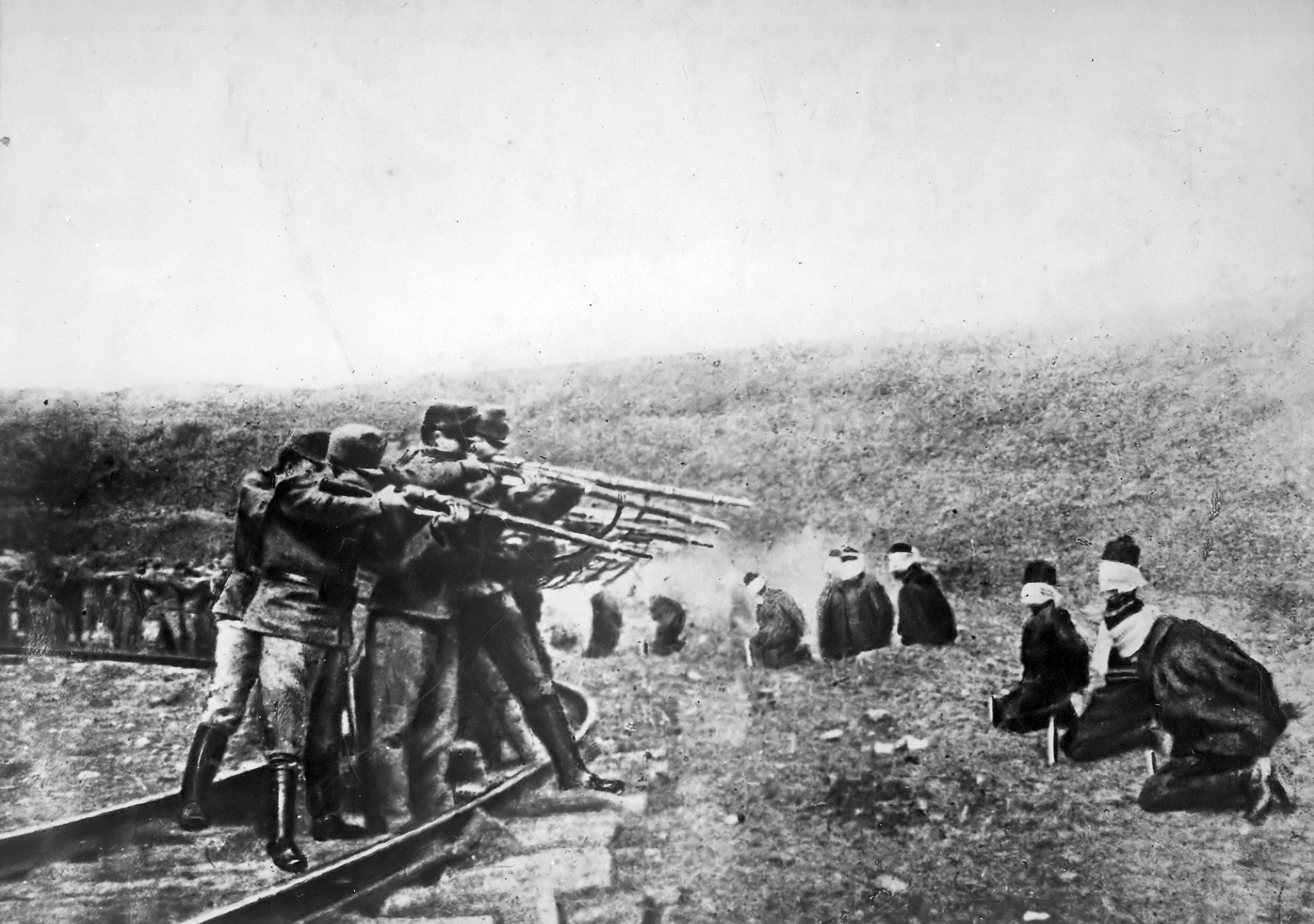
Austro-Hungarian firing squad executing Serbian civilians in 1917

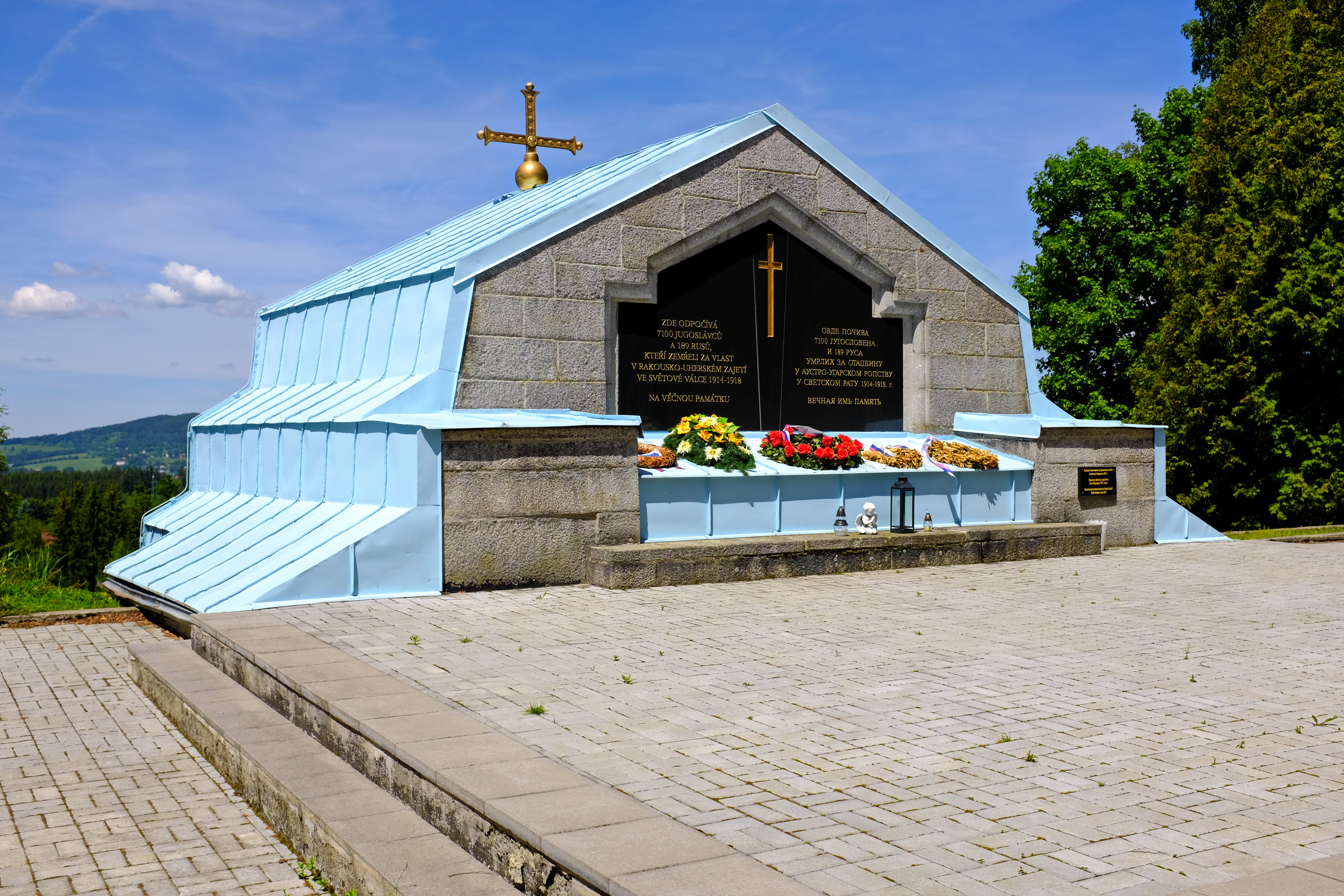
Memorial to military and the concentration camp victims in Jindřichovice

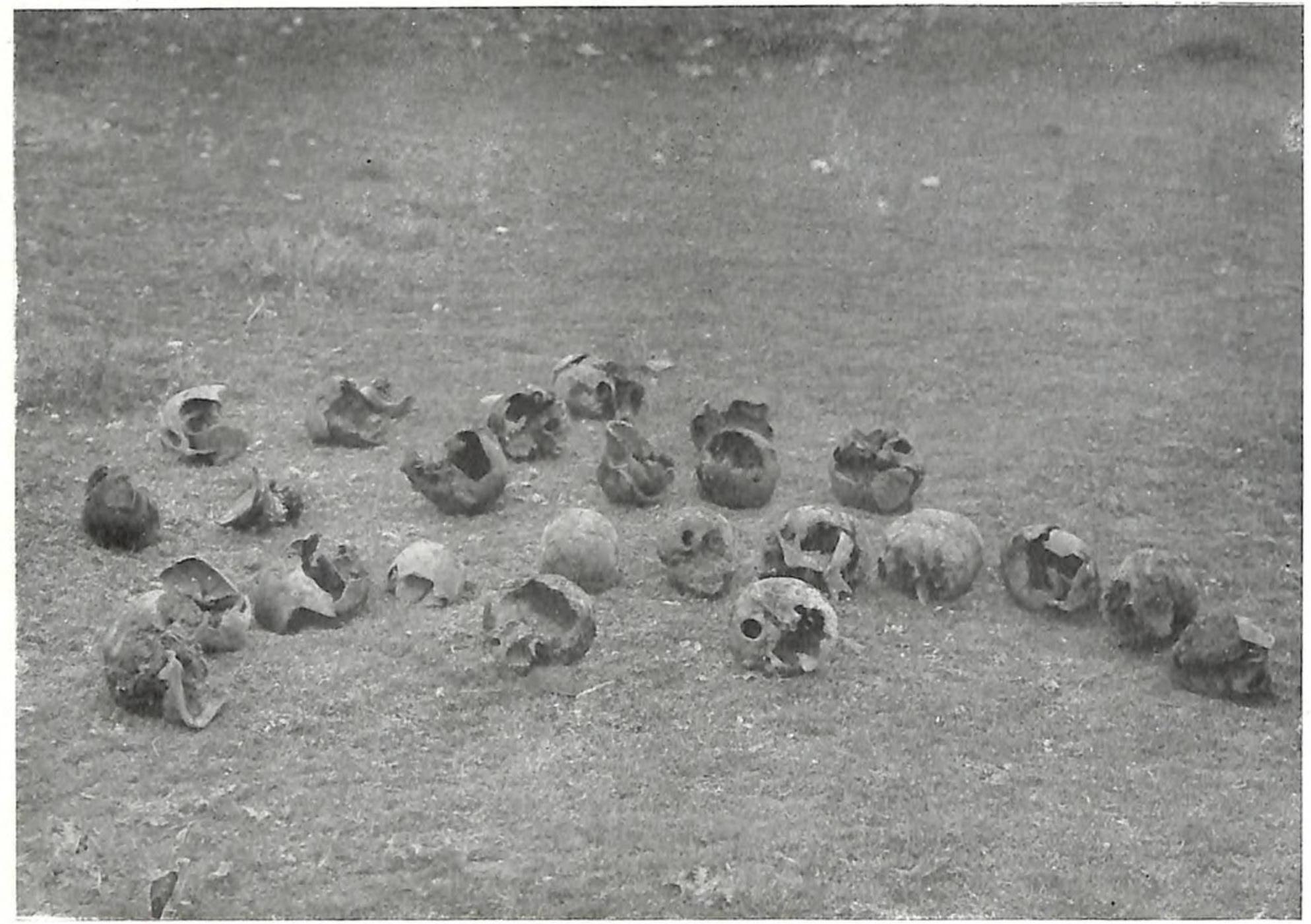
Remains of the Štip massacre victims

== See also ==
- Austro-Hungarian occupation of Serbia
- Bulgarian occupation of Serbia (World War I)
- World War I in Albania
- Momčilo Gavrić (soldier)
- Great Retreat (Serbia)
- World War I casualties
