= Milivoje Anđelković =

Serbian colonel (1868-1940)

Milivoje Anđelković Миливоје Анђелковић
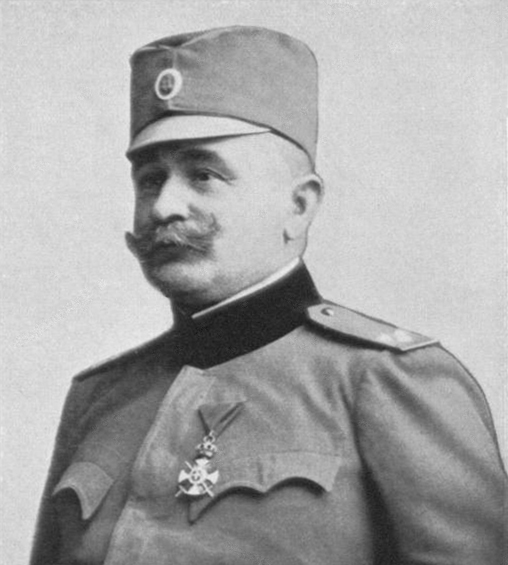
- Born: 20 June 1868; Belgrade, Serbia
- Died: 6 February 1940 (aged 71); Belgrade, Belgrade City Administration, Yugoslavia
- Military career
- Allegiance: Serbia
- Branch: Royal Serbian Army
- Service years: 1897–1917
- Rank: Pukovnik
- Conflicts: May Coup; First Balkan War; Second Balkan War: Battle at Govedarnik; World War I: Serbian campaign; Battle of Mačkova Kamen; Battle of Kolubara

Milivoje Anđelković (Serbian: Миливоје Анђелковић), known by his nickname Kajafa (Кајафа), was a Serbian colonel during the early 20th century. He participated with his unit in the May Coup. During the First Balkan War in 1912, he commanded the Javorski Brigade and during the Second Balkan War, he was the commander of the Osogovo detachment and the Masuric column. From the beginning of World War I until the Great Retreat, he commanded the Danube Division. In 1914, he was the main commander during the defense of Belgrade during the Srem Offensive and at the Battle of Mačkova Kamen. He especially stood out in the pursuit of the enemy after the Battle of Kolubara. After the reorganization of the Royal Serbian Army at Corfu, he was again the commander of the Danube Division but would retire in 1917.

== Balkan Wars ==
Milivoje was born at Belgrade in 1868 and he graduated from all military schools that could be attended in the then Kingdom of Serbia. From 1897 to 1902, he was the head of the cadets of the Military Command. Then, as a lecturer, he also met Dragutin Dimitrijević "Apis". He participated in the May Coup as his role in the plot was to open an entrance to the palace as it was protected by the battalion of the Seventh Infantry Regiment commanded by Anđelković, already known by the nickname Kajafa (from "Caiaphas").

He earned the nickname Kajafa as despite being a very young officer, he drove order and discipline down to the smallest detail by torturing others, but not even sparing himself. He commanded the Javor Brigade in the First Balkan War against the Turks in 1912, consisting of 37,400 men and 144 cannons towards the Raška region. He was able to go deep into the rear of the enemy, liberating Sjenica, Prijepolje and Pljevlja in a rapid pace while being far from the main Serbian forces and acting completely independently. In the Battle at Govedarnik against Bulgaria in the Second Balkan War, on 21 and 22 July, he took three positions with a bayonet charge that were defended by a much more numerous and better armed Bulgarian force.

== World War I ==
Anđelković began playing a major role within the Royal Serbian Army upon the outbreak of World War I. The Supreme Command with the absence of its chief, vojvoda Radomir Putnik, decided to leave the fate of Belgrade to Anđelković. He immediately decided that Belgrade must be defended at the cost of being completely destroyed. He would thus begin defending it, even with the help of third-party volunteers, until the order came that it was necessary to retreat from the city. During the Battle of Mačkov Kamen from 19 to 22 September 1914, entered the textbooks of heroism. Here too, Kajafa was often stubbornly ahead of the rest of the Serbian forces.

His participation in the Battle of Kolubara was seen as of an exceptional level. A rather serious anger of his superiors towards colonel Anđelković originated from the time before the fatal attack. This was due to Anđelković taking prince regent Aleksandar Karađorđević to the front lines where he could've been wounded or killed. Neither scenario occurred but it would be the first time that Kajafa experienced the political interference within the Army. Due to one failure in the 1915 Serbian campaign which resulted in heavy losses, he was accused of incompetence and despite lacking correct information about the numerical state of the Bulgarian forces, he would retired on 20 July 1917.

== Post-war life ==
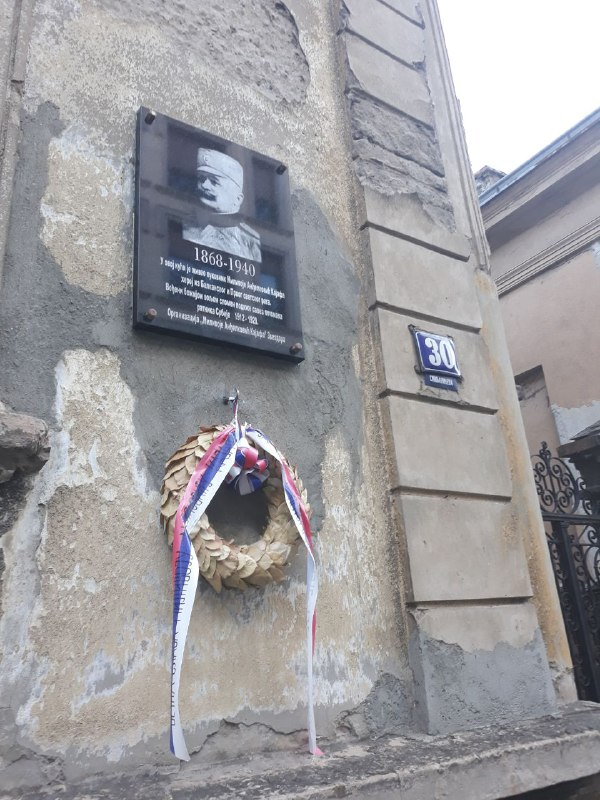
Memorial plaque on the house of Colonel Kajafa at Smiljanićeva no. 30 in Belgrade.

The humiliation of a soldier of a special kind who was prematurely driven from the battlefield wouldn't conclude even as the War concluded. The former military teacher of princes Đorđe and Aleksandar would have both of them address him as Bata Mika out of respect in 1925. it was even on the front pages of the capital's newspapers. This way: "The search at Mr. M. Anđelković... Apart from the personal belongings of Mr. Anđelković, two chests belonging to Đorđe Kraljević were also found in his apartment. The chests were locked and sealed...".

In addition, according to newspapers at the time, Anđelković was also accused of "communist propaganda" which seriously undermined the honor and reputation of the retired colonel. Namely, it was the time when King Aleksandar needed to place his older brother Đorđe, the heir to the throne by birth priority in a sanatorium near Niš and as far away from the throne as possible. It was common knowledge that Prince Đorđe and Colonel Anđelković were great friends and that before the prince's sending to the sanatorium and the search of the retired officer's house, they planned to travel together to Switzerland and through Thessaloniki, to once again visit the grave of Dragutin Dimitrijević.

A few years after the liberation and just after the aforementioned newspaper raid, King Aleksandar sent his court marshal to the retired colonel with a message that he would like to stop by his place when he was passing through Smiljanićeva Street, where Kajafa lived. Reportedly, Aleksandar offered Anđelković the rank of general and all the privileges that belong to him with that rank since 1917. Kajafa replied briefly: "Greet His Majesty and tell him that he is master in his country and I, in my house." When the king passed through Smiljanićeva Street, the blinds in house number 30 were lowered, as they remained until Kajafa's death on 6 February 1940.
