= Serbian-Turkish War =

The term Serbian-Turkish War or Serbian-Ottoman War may refer to:

- Serbian-Turkish War (1371)
- Serbian-Turkish War (1389)
- Serbian-Turkish War (1804-1813)
- Serbian-Turkish War (1815)
- Serbian-Turkish War (1876-1877)
- Serbian-Turkish War (1877-1878)
- Serbian-Turkish War (1912-1913), during the First Balkan War
- Serbian-Turkish War (1914-1918), during the First World War

== See also ==
- List of Serbian-Turkish Wars
- Serbian Uprising (disambiguation)
- Serbian-Bulgarian War (disambiguation)
