= Herzegovinian =

Herzegovinian may refer to:

- Something of, or related to Herzegovina
- Herzegovinians, regional term for the general population of Herzegovina
  - Herzegovinian Croats, term for ethnic Croats from the region of Herzegovina
  - Herzegovinian Serbs, term for ethnic Serbs from the region of Herzegovina
- Herzegovinian uprisings, term for several uprisings in Herzegovina
- Herzegovinian Sanjak, an administrative region of the Ottoman Empire
- Herzegovinian Eyalet, an administrative province of the Ottoman Empire
- Herzegovinian Eparchy, a diocese of the Serbian Orthodox Church
- Eastern Herzegovinian dialect, a dialect of Serbian language. Note that there is no language called "Herzegovinian" (see Languages of Bosnia and Herzegovina)

== See also ==
- Herzegovina (disambiguation)
- Herzegovina Uprising (disambiguation)
- Federation of Bosnia and Herzegovina
