= Uprising in Bosnia and Herzegovina =

Uprising in Bosnia and Herzegovina may refer to:

- Uprising in Bosnia and Herzegovina (1831-1832), uprising of Muslim nobility in Bosnia and Herzegovina, against the Ottoman central government
- Uprising in Bosnia and Herzegovina (1875-1878), uprising of Serbs in Bosnia and Herzegovina against the Ottoman Empire
- Uprising in Bosnia and Herzegovina (1941), uprising against occupation of Nazi Germany and Fascist Italy

== See also ==
- Herzegovina Uprising (disambiguation)
- Serbian Uprising (disambiguation)
