= Bulgarian occupation of Serbia =

Bulgarian occupation of Serbia (Serbian: Бугарска окупација Србије / Bugarska okupacija Srbije) may refer to:

- Bulgarian occupation of Serbia (World War I)
- Bulgarian occupation of Serbia (World War II)

== See also ==
- Bulgarian-Serbian War (disambiguation)
- Toplica Uprising
