= 1882 Herzegovina uprising =

Uprising in Herzegovina

Herzegovina uprising
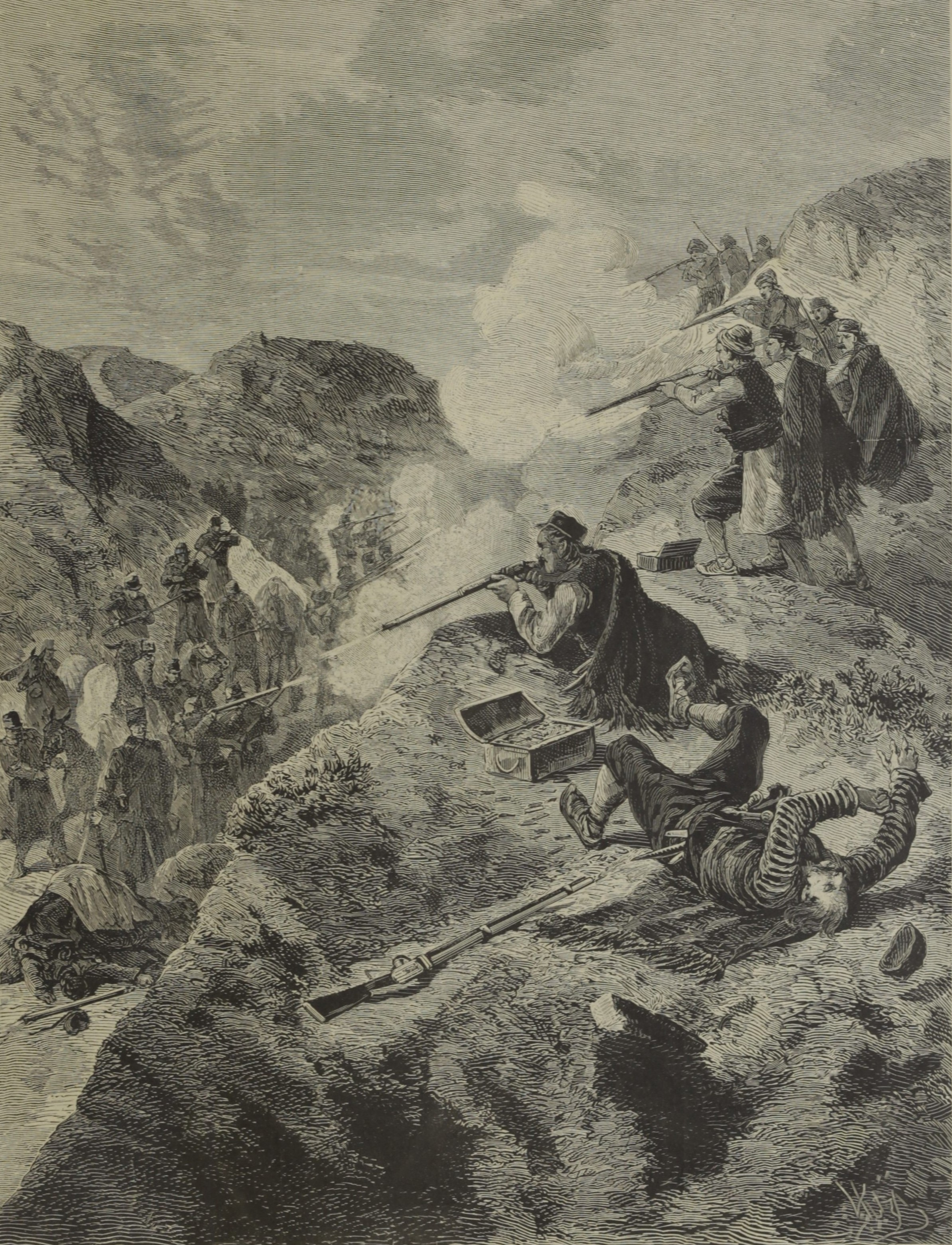
- Attack on the Austro-Hungarian supply column near Korito
| Date | January–April 1882 |
| Location | Herzegovina |
| Result | Austro-Hungarian victory |

Belligerents
| Austria-Hungary | Serbian rebels Muslim rebels |

Commanders and leaders
| (Austria-Hungary) Stjepan Jovanović | Stojan Kovančević; Salih-Salko Forta |

The 1882 Herzegovina uprising (Serbo-Croatian Latin: Hercegovački ustanak) was an uprising by Serbian and Bosniak populations in Bosnia and Herzegovina against Austro-Hungarian rule. It was preceded by the Herzegovina uprising of 1875–1877.

The uprising began in January 1882 in response to the introduction of conscription in Bosnia and Herzegovina and opposition to Austro-Hungarian rule. The uprising was suppressed by Austro-Hungarian forces by April 1882.

== History ==
=== Emergence ===
Trouble begain with the Congress of Berlin, solving the so-called Great Eastern Crisis. After a short campaign, the Austro-Hungarian army occupied Bosnia and Herzegovina, a former territory of the Ottoman Empire. This caused resentment among the ethnically and religiously mixed population. The situation escalated at the beginning of 1882. The main reason for the uprising was the unresolved agrarian issue, taxes and the military duty imposed on the local population. It was officially decided that the population of the most recently acquired territory of the Habsburg Monarchy should also serve in its army. This outraged locals, since Bosnia still formally belonged to the Ottoman Empire and only the Sultan could make such a decision. The Bosniaks reacted by massively migrating to Turkish territories (especially to Sandžak), the Serbs initially protested, which led to an armed uprising around the city of Foča.

On the night of 11 January, a group of armed peasants attacked gendarmerie barracks in Ulog. The center of the uprising was there and the rebel government formed there. Most rebels were poor peasants. The uprising soon spread to northeast Herzegovina and southeast Bosnia. Between January and February, rebels commanded by Stojan Kovačević and Salih-Salko Forta tried to attack Foča and Trnovo (south and southeast from Sarajevo). Their main goal was the liberation of Sarajevo. However, their units, poorly armed and operating separately, were unable to achieve success in the fight against superior enemy forces.

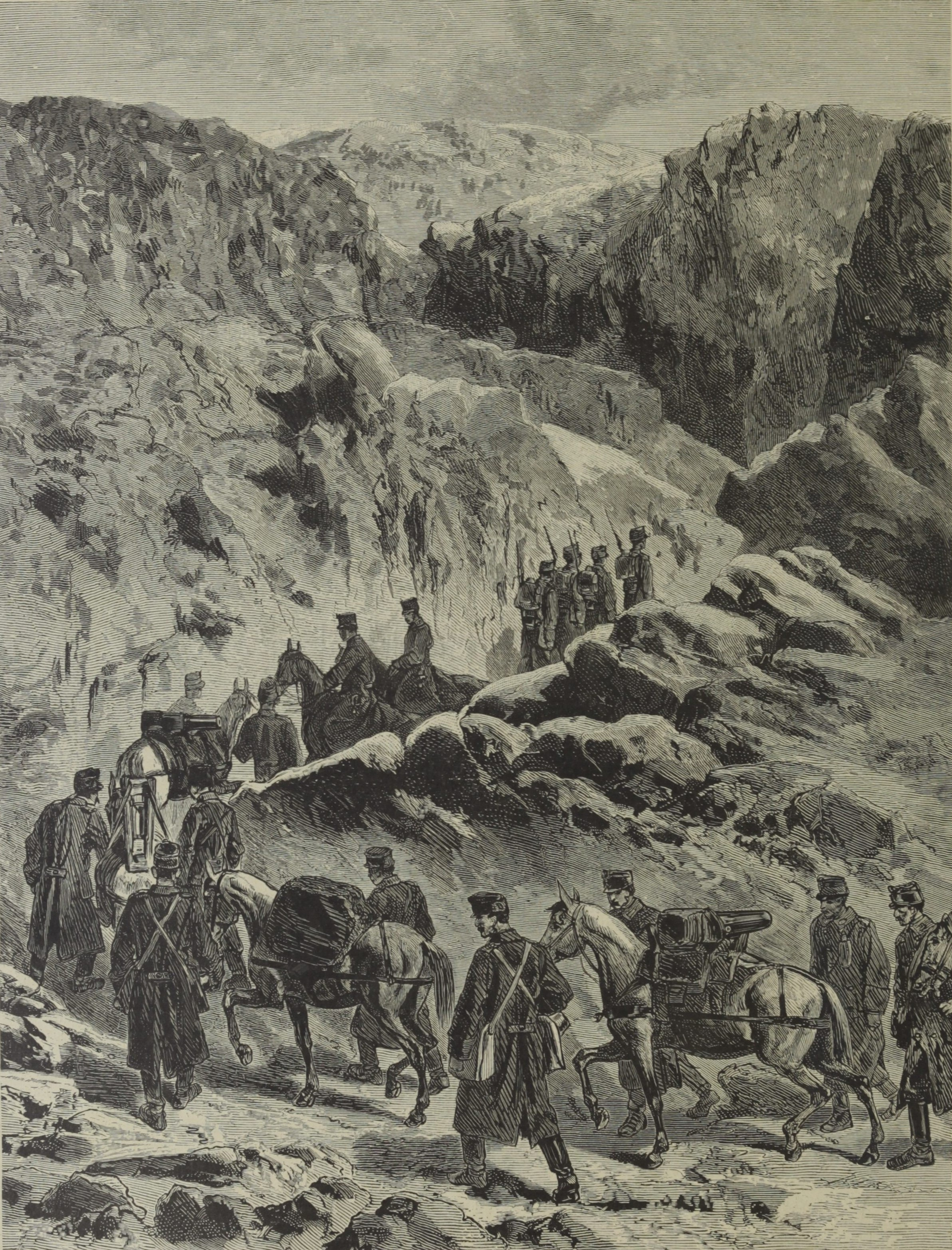
Advance of Austro-Hungarian artillerymen through mountain terrain (Neue Illustrirte Zeitung, 1882)

=== Suppression ===
Austro-Hungarian forces of about 10,000 infantry and four artillery batteries mobilized against the uprising. Several thousand rebels, poorly armed and operating independently, subsequently had difficulty achieving success in the fight against superior enemy numbers. Heavy fighting in the beginning of February Bohemian 75th infantry regiment and Austrian 77th infantry regiment in battles of Brod and near Budanje.

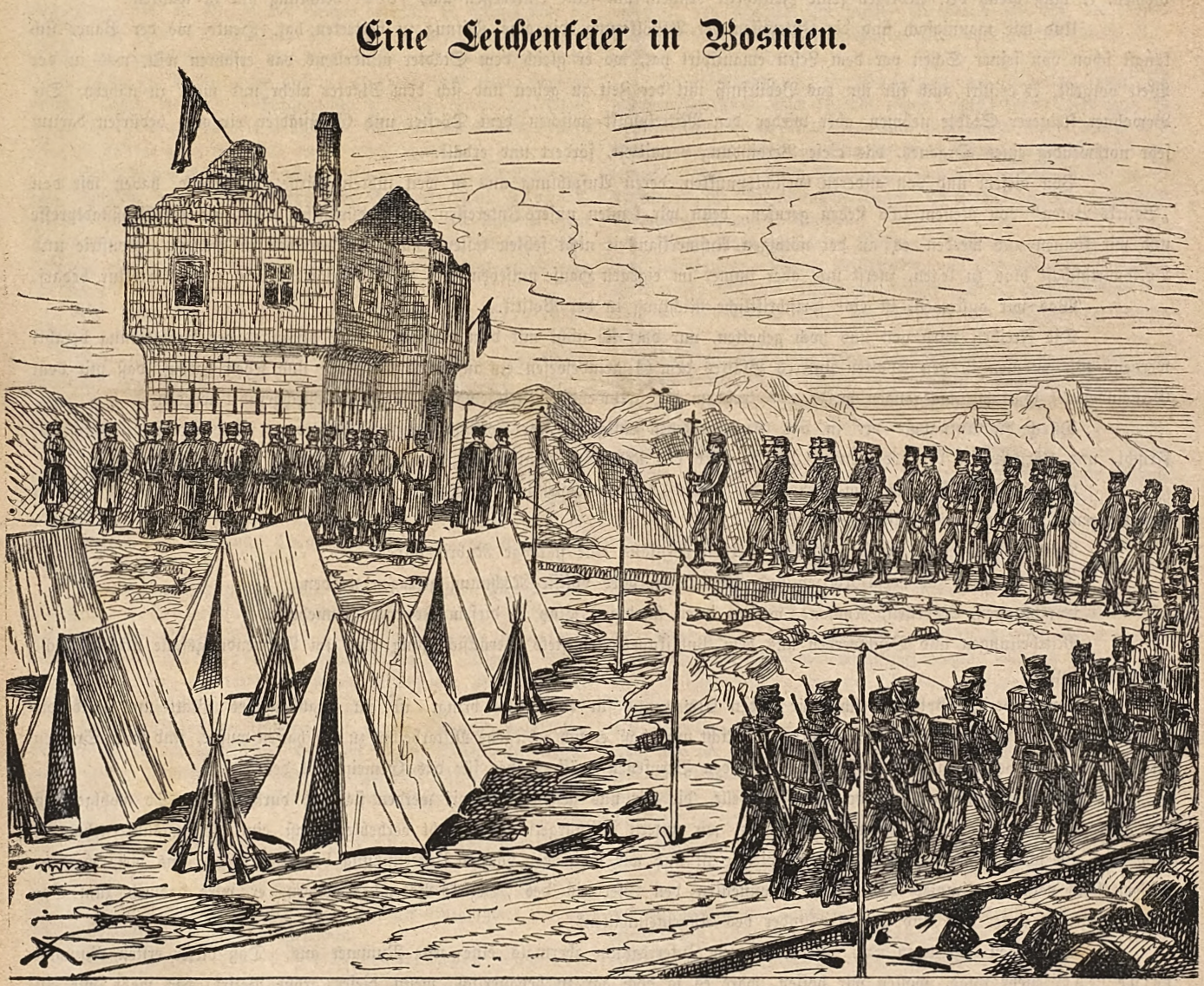
Burial of Austro-Hungarian officer in Crkvice (engraving from Austrian printer, May 1882)

In April 1882, the Austro-Hungarian army suppressed the uprising. In smaller areas near border with Montenegro resistance continued for a few weeks. Sporadic sabotage and guerrilla actions continued until November 1882.

== See also ==
- Herzegovina uprising (1875–1877)
- Beni Kállay
