= Štip massacre =

Massacre in Serbia

Coordinates: 41°40′N 22°14′E

- Part of World War I
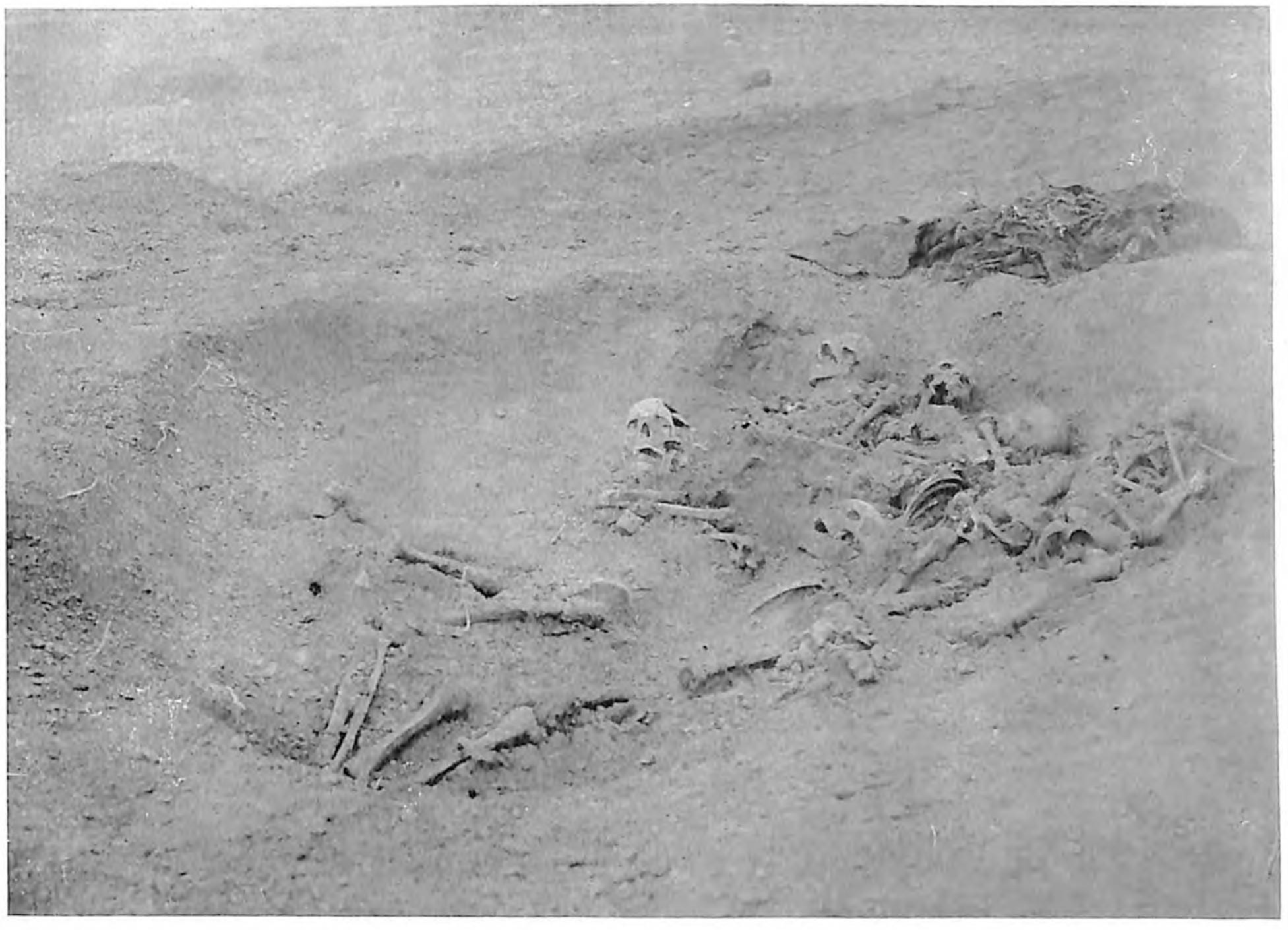
- Exhumed remains of those killed in the massacre.
- Location: Ljuboten, Štip region, Kingdom of Serbia
- Date: 26 October 1915
- Target: Serbian army POWs
- Attack type: Summary executions, war crime
- Deaths: 118–120
- Perpetrators: 11th Macedonian Division; Internal Macedonian Revolutionary Organization

The Štip massacre was the mass murder of Serbian soldiers by paramilitary forces of the Internal Macedonian Revolutionary Organization (IMRO) in the village of Ljuboten, Štip on 15 October 1915, during World War I. Sick and wounded Serbian soldiers, recuperating at the Štip town hospital, were detained by Macedonian IMRO militants before being taken into the vicinity of Ljuboten and killed. An estimated 118–120 Serbian soldiers were executed in the massacre.

== Massacre ==
On 15 October 1915, two Bulgarian armies attacked, overrunning Serbian units, penetrating into the valley of the South Morava river near Vranje up to 22 October 1915. The Bulgarian forces conquered Kumanovo, Štip, and Skopje, and prevented the withdrawal of the Serbian army to the Greek border and Salonika. Štip was conquered by the 3rd Brigade of the Bulgarian Army 11th Macedonian Infantry Division, organized by former IMRO members, commanded by Aleksandar Protogerov and the IMRO band of Todor Aleksandrov.

Štip and the surrounding area were looted by Bulgarian soldiers who refused to obey orders of requisition. On 26 October, Protogerov ordered the execution of 118–120 wounded and sick Serbian soldiers who at the time were recuperating at the Štip town hospital. Elements of IMRO commanded by Ivan Barlyo and the 11th Bulgarian Division then transported to the outskirts of the Ljuboten village, where they were summarily executed. Similar massacres of Serbian prisoners of war and civilians continued until the end of the war.

== Aftermath ==
The Paris Peace Conference separated war crimes into 32 specific classes, forming the basis for the future persecution of war criminals identified in previous national and inter–allied commissions. However the question was subsequently forsaken and the responsibility for the trials fell upon the national courts of the Central Powers. A post war Inter–Allied War Commission investigated allegations leveled against Bulgaria, concluding that Bulgarian occupational authorities in Serbia and Greece had breached every single article of the Hague Conventions of 1899 and 1907. The Bulgarian delegation at the Paris Peace Conference said that crimes were grossly exaggerated, and that the text prepared by the Inter-Allied War Commission was full of falsifications. Those accusations were immediately answered by both the Serbian and the Greek governments in two memorandums entitled: Les mensonges Bulgares (The Bulgarian lies) and Une reponse à La vérité sur les accusations contre la Bulgarie. (An answer to the truth about the accusations against Bulgaria) which were in their turn submitted to the Paris Peace Conference.

The facts of the Štip massacre were confirmed and its victims were exhumed and the perpetrators were identified. The kingdom of Serbia presented a list of 500 Bulgarians it suspected of war crimes, based on the commission's findings. Bulgaria's official response to the enquiry stated that 3 people were arrested and 2 executed for their involvement in various violations of the rules of war. This was later proved to be false, none of the accused were ever convicted of their crimes. In 1925, by order of Ivan Mihailov, Ivan Barlyo was executed for stubbornness and bad morals.

== Gallery ==
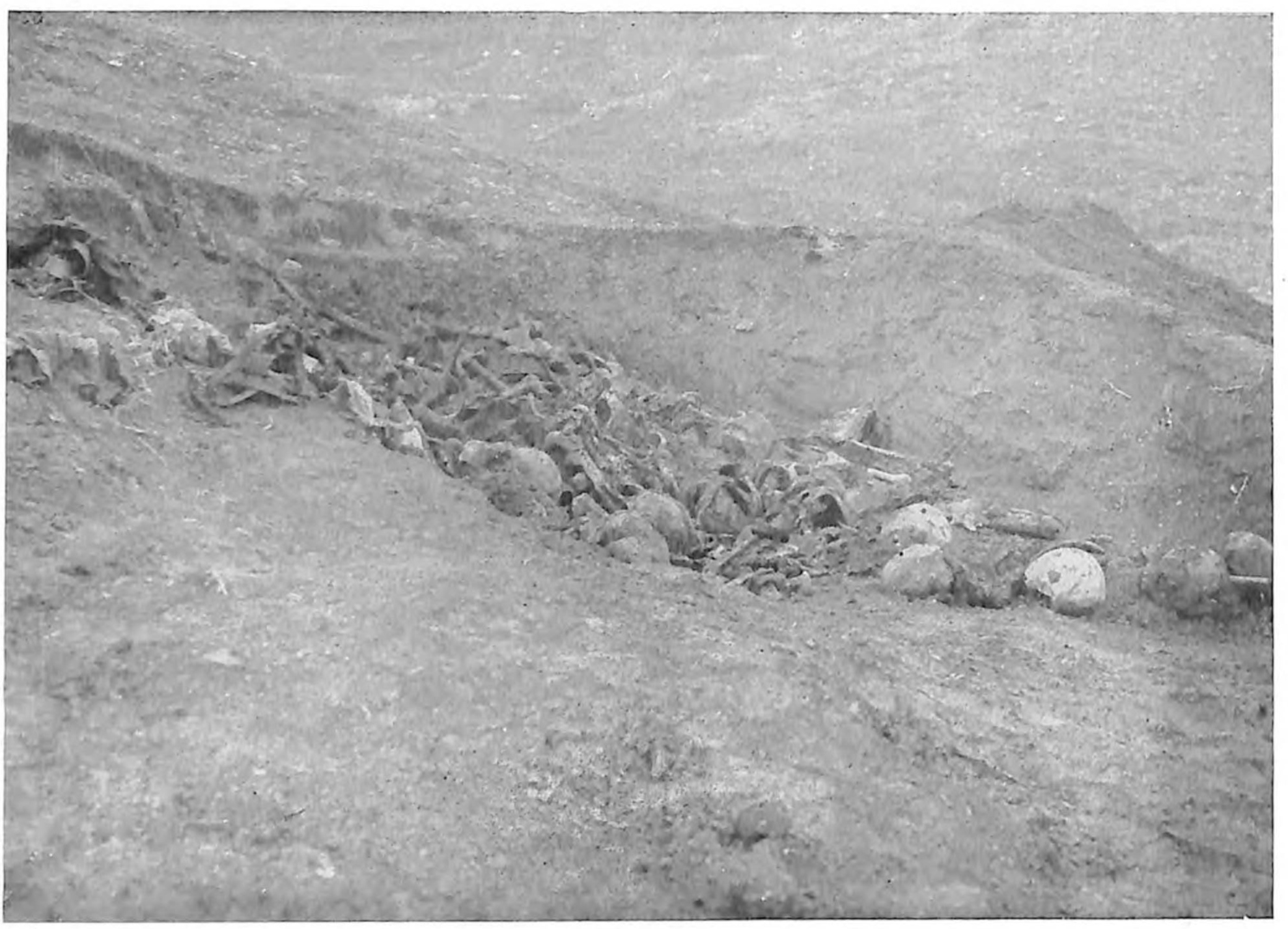
Remains exhumed in Ljuboten

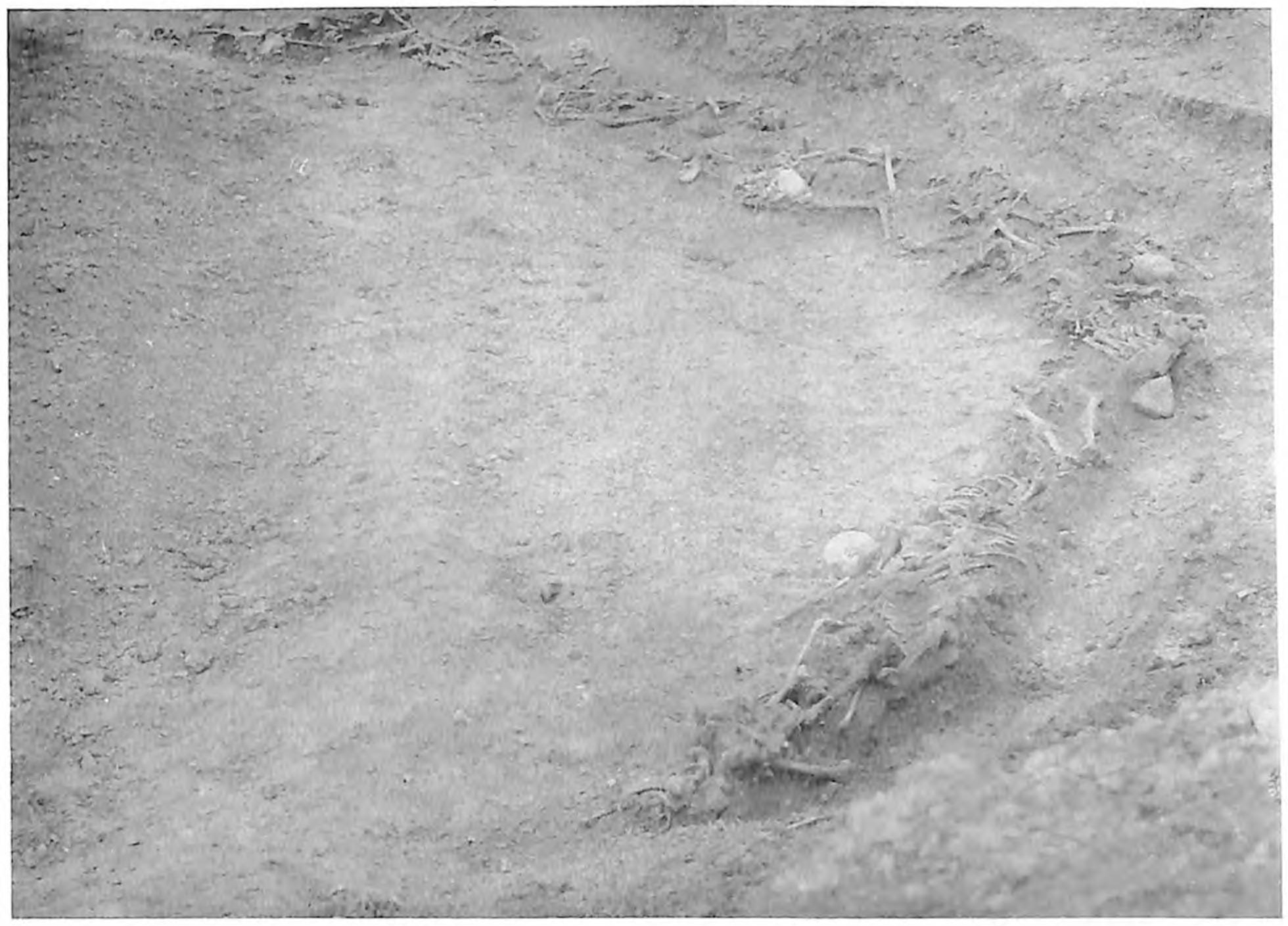
Remains exhumed in Ljuboten

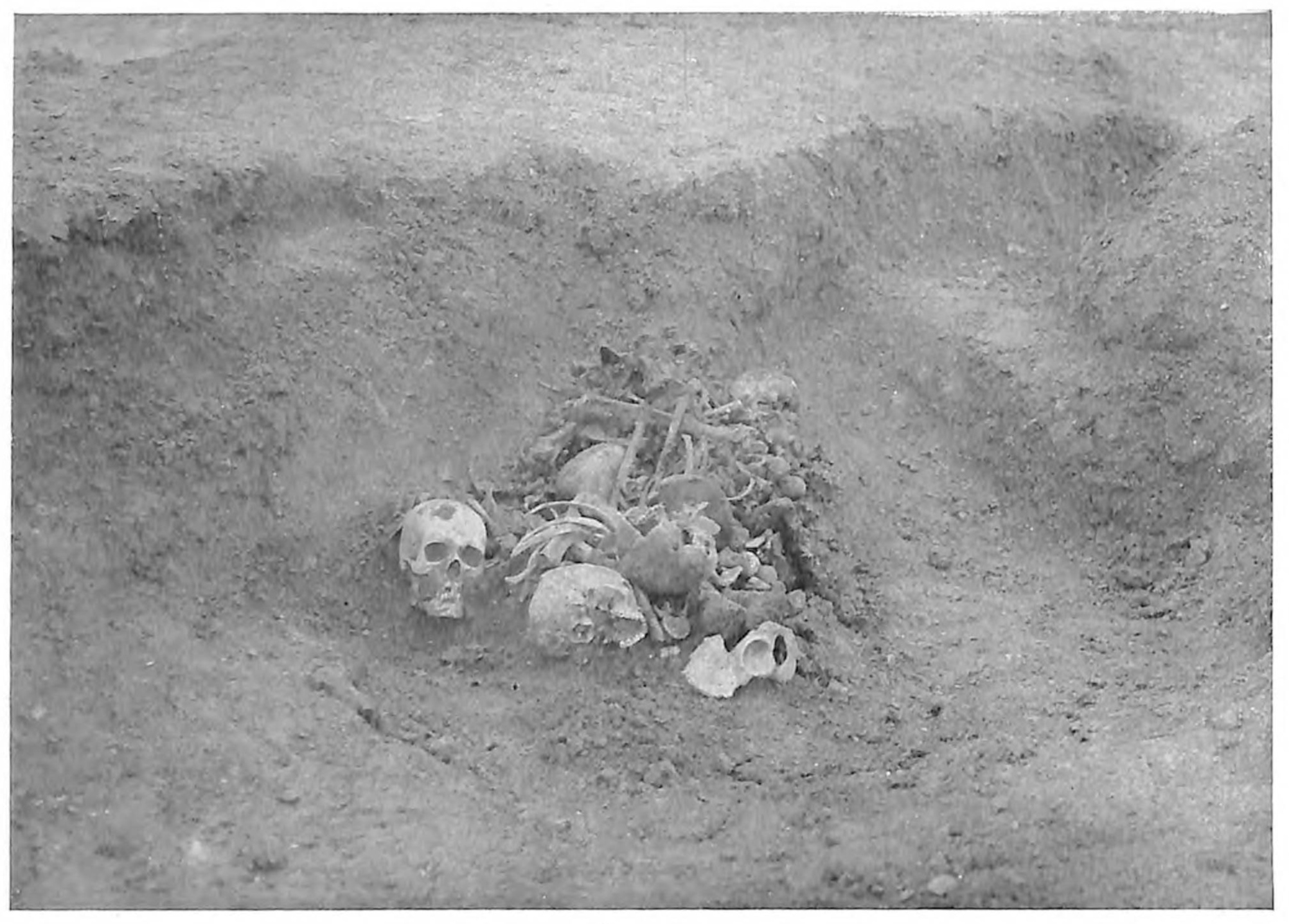
Remains exhumed in Ljuboten

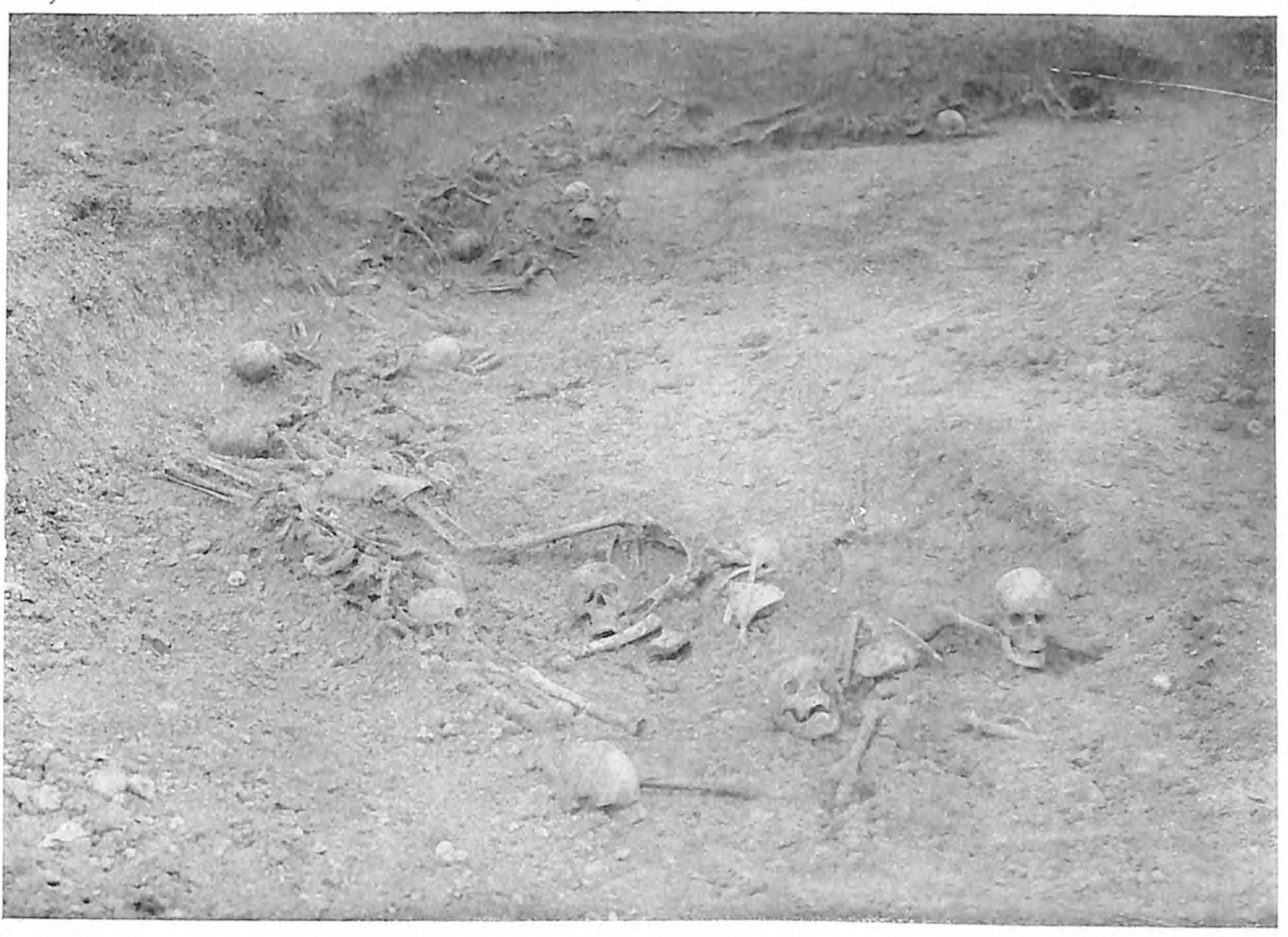
Remains exhumed in Ljuboten

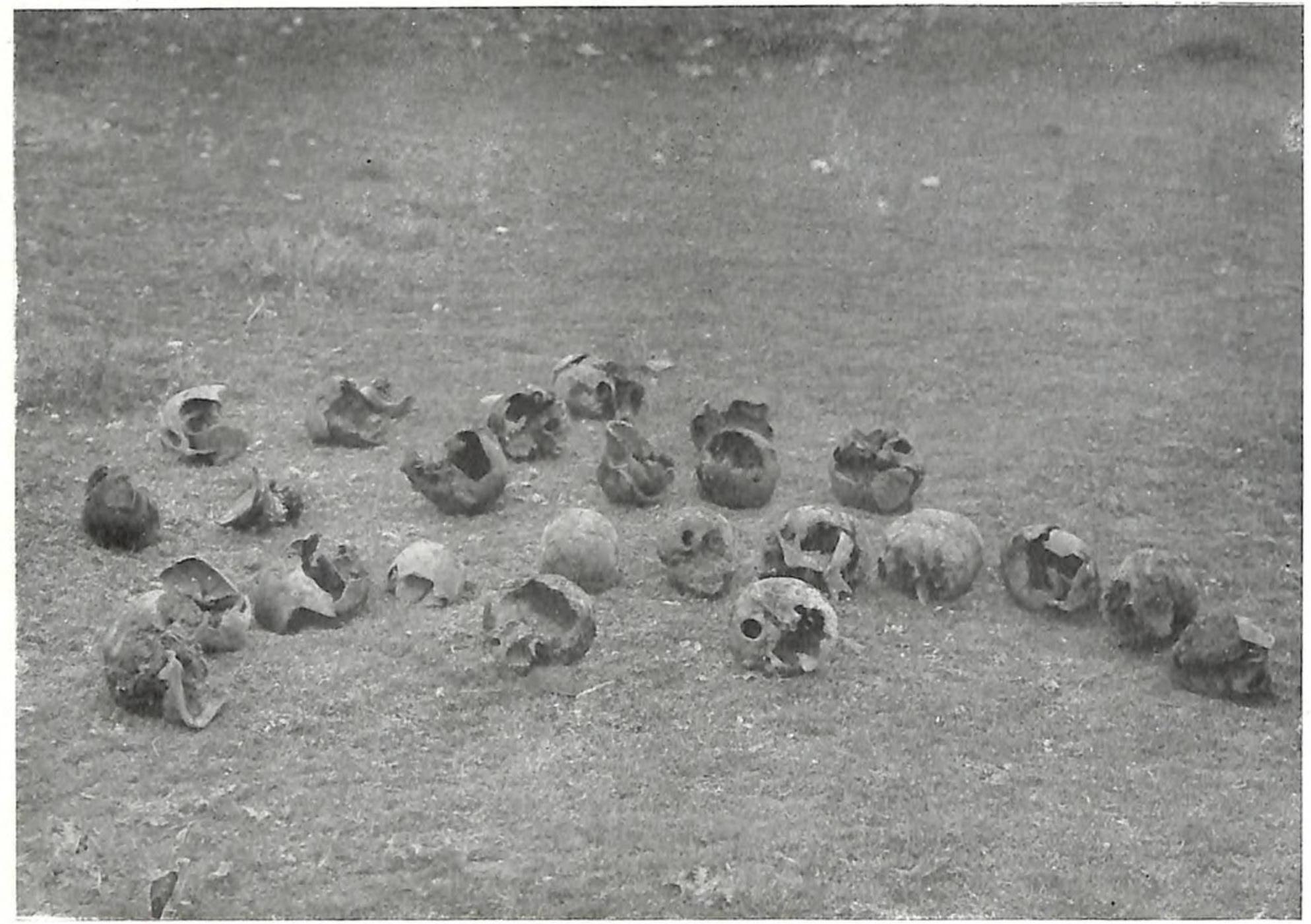
Remains exhumed in Ljuboten

== See also ==
- Surdulica massacre
