= Surdulica massacre =

Bulgarian murder of Serbs during WWI

Coordinates: 42°41′N 22°10′E

- Part of World War I
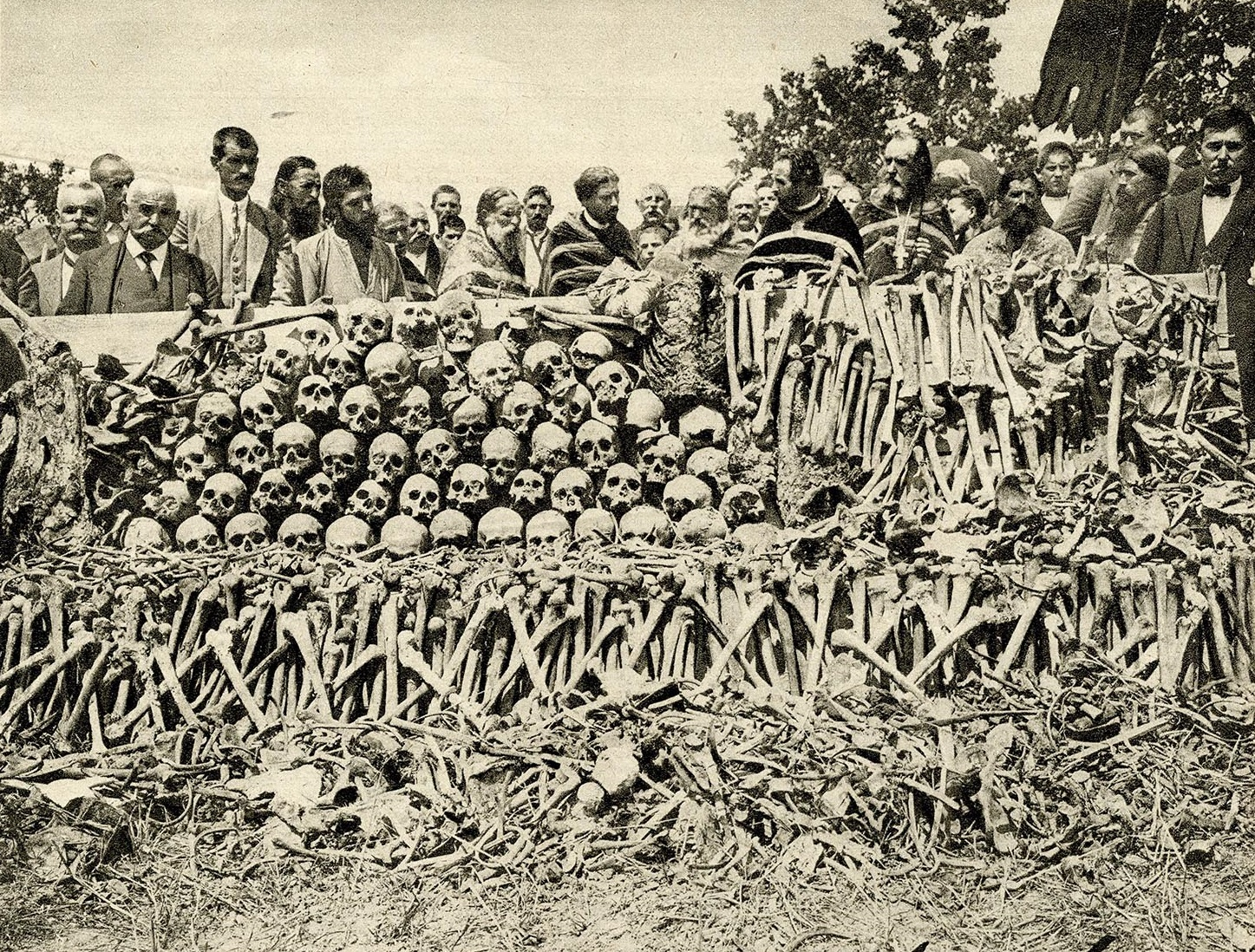
- The remains of those killed in the massacre exhumed in 1926.
- Location: Surdulica, Kingdom of Serbia
- Date: November 1915–February 1916
- Target: Serbian men
- Attack type: Summary executions
- Deaths: 2,000–3,000
- Perpetrator: Bulgarian occupational authorities

A mass murder of Serbian men by Bulgarian occupational authorities occurred in the southern Serbian town of Surdulica between 1915 and 1916, during World War I.

Members of the Serbian intelligentsia in the region, mostly functionaries, teachers, priests and former soldiers, were detained by Bulgarian forces—ostensibly so that they could be deported to the Bulgarian capital, Sofia—before being taken to Surdulica and killed. An estimated 2,000–3,000 Serbian men were executed by the Bulgarians in the town. Witnesses to the massacre were interviewed by American writer William Drayton in December 1918 and January 1919.

== Background ==
Austria-Hungary declared war on Serbia on 28 July, marking the beginning of World War I. Serbia was invaded by a combined German and Austro-Hungarian force on 7 October 1915. On 14 October, the Kingdom of Bulgaria declared war on Serbia and invaded the country from the east. The Serbian Army was forced to retreat through Albania. Serbia was divided between the Austro-Hungarians, Germans and Bulgarians. The Bulgarian occupation zone was located in the area between the cities of Skopje and Niš, which had been a target of Bulgarian nationalism.

As Bulgarians emphasize, before 1878, that area was part of the Bulgarian Morava and under the jurisdiction of the Bulgarian Exarchate and had certain Bulgarophile intelligentsia, but afterwards it was ceded to Serbia and pro-Serbian sentiments became prevailing ubiquitously. A policy of Bulgarianisation targeting ethnic Serbs was implemented there. As result in September 1916, the Serbian high command sent Kosta Pećanac in the Toplica District to organize a guerrilla uprising.

There, Pećanac contacted several groups and joined forces with local leaders. As a consequence, one of the first measures undertaken by the Bulgarian military authorities was the mass-deportation of non-Bulgarian adult males. On 16 December 1916, the Bulgarian military governor of the occupied Serbian territories ordered that "all men between 18 and 50 who have served in the Serbian Army, all officers, former teachers, priests, journalists, former deputies, military functionaries, and all suspected persons, should be arrested and interned". Arrests of Serbian men followed.

In January–February 1917, the Bulgarians began conscripting local Serbs for military service and a rumor was spread that the Allies had reached Skopje, so the Serbs should rise in revolt. The decision for this rebellion was taken and on 21 February, and the Toplica rebellion broke out. Its leaders gathered several hundreds of rebels who conquered Prokuplje and Kuršumlija. Pećanac also attempted to attract Albanians on his side, but without success. On 12 March, the Bulgarian counterattack started under the command of Alexander Protogerov involving comitadjis' forces of the Internal Macedonian Revolutionary Organisation.

After several days of fighting, the Bulgarians entered Prokuplje on 14 March and Austro-Hungarians the Kuršumlija. As of 25 March, the order there was fully restored. In the battles, several thousand people were killed, including civilians. In April 1917, the Serbian guerrillas attacked a railway station and on 15 May, Pecanac entered the old Bulgarian border and invaded the town Bosilegrad, which was inhabited by Bulgarians, and burned it down. Then he withdrew to Kosovo, controlled then by the Austro-Hungarians.

== Massacre ==
By these circumstances many Serbian men in the occupied territories were detained by Bulgarian patrolmen, ostensibly to be taken to the Bulgarian capital, Sofia. Instead, they were taken to the town of Surdulica and killed, as historian Andrej Mitrović described it, "using the most brutal methods". At one time Bulgarian soldiers disobeyed the orders and the victims were handed over to the komitajis of the Internal Macedonian Revolutionary Organisation, who already had conducted such killings in the same area. Colonel von Lustig, an Austro-Hungarian liaison attached to the German 11th Army, reported:

It is known that most of the Serbian intelligentsia, i.e. functionaries, teachers, priests and others, withdrew with what was left of the Serbian Army, but a certain number of them gradually started to return for psychological or material reasons. Here, in [Bulgarian]-occupied territory, it is virtually impossible to find either them or those that did not flee; they have "gone to Sofia", as the new Bulgarian saying goes. These men were handed over to Bulgarian patrols (usually komitadji) as suspects without any judicial procedure, with the order that they should be "taken to Sofia". The patrols usually return the next day without them. Whether they are taken 20 or 200 kilometers, it is all the same. The patrols pack up spades, disappear into the mountains and quickly return, but without the prisoners. Bulgarian officers do not even try to conceal the executions, they boast about them.

A commission consisting of Colonel Kalkadzhiev, Major Ilkov, Second Lieutenant Yurukov and Sergeant Vitanov, from the 42nd Regiment, 3rd Brigade, 1st Division "Sofia", and Second Lieutenant Simonov and Sergeant Erchikov of the 5th Place Regiment, filtered the deported prisoners in Surdolica and decided on the executions. An estimated 2,000–3,000 Serbian men were executed by the Bulgarians in Surdulica. Mass executions also occurred in a place near Surdolica called "Duboka Dolina" and the bodies of the victims were buried in mass graves. At the same time the Bulgarian military authorities killed also many civilians in Vranje, Zajecar, Kacanik, and other places in that area.

== Gallery ==
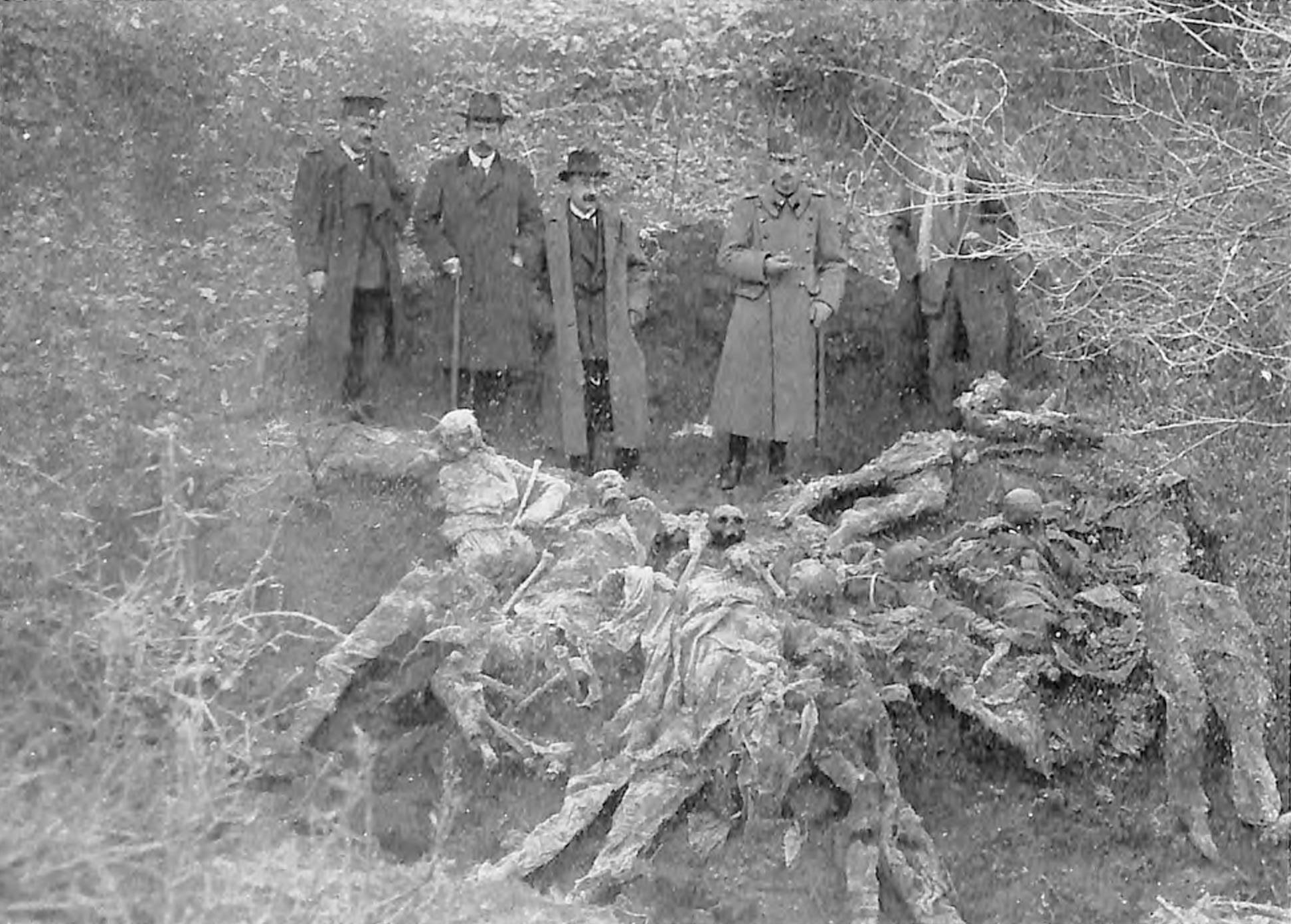
Corpses exhumed in Duboka Dolina

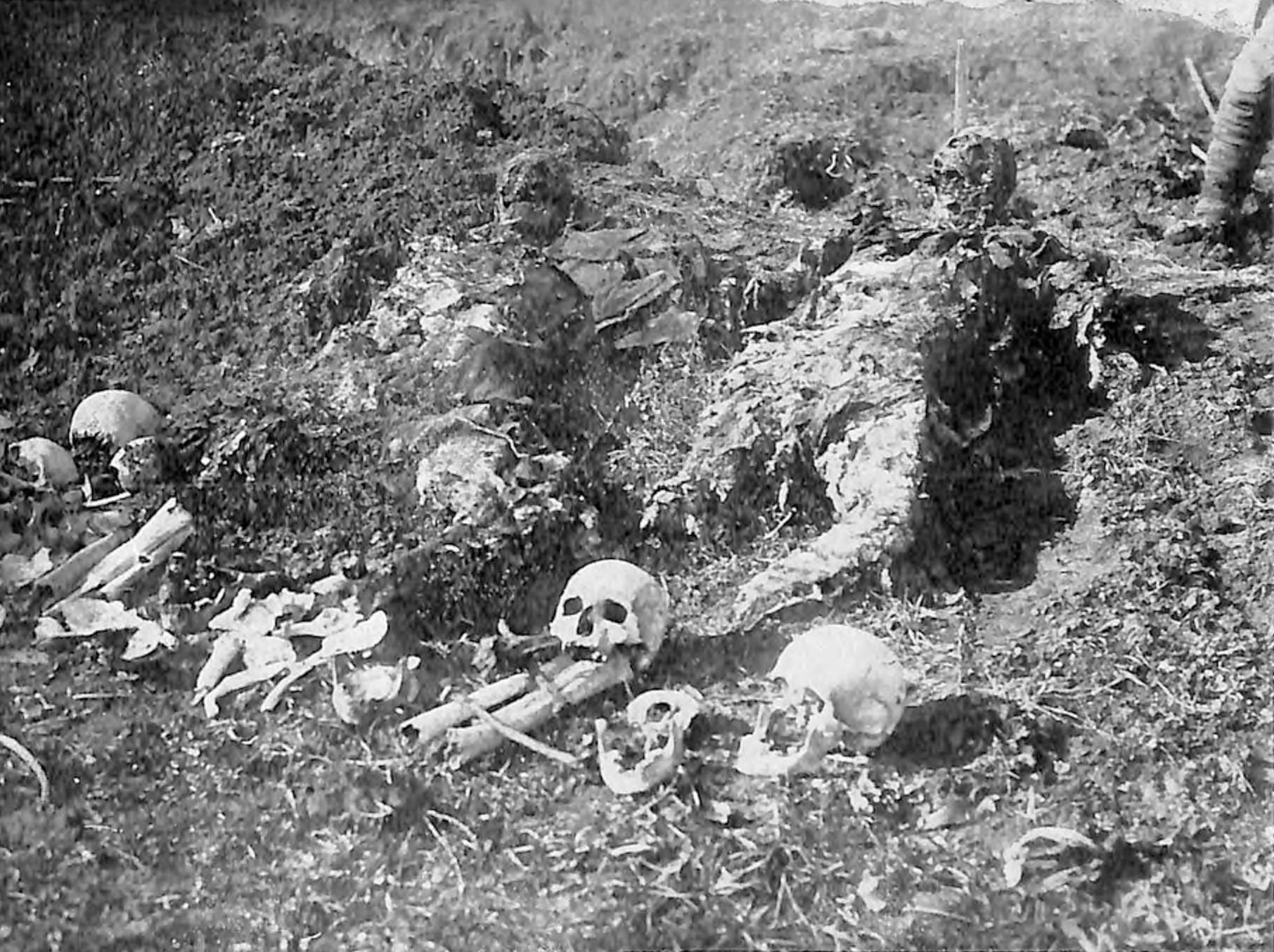
Remains of seven civilians shot in Vranje

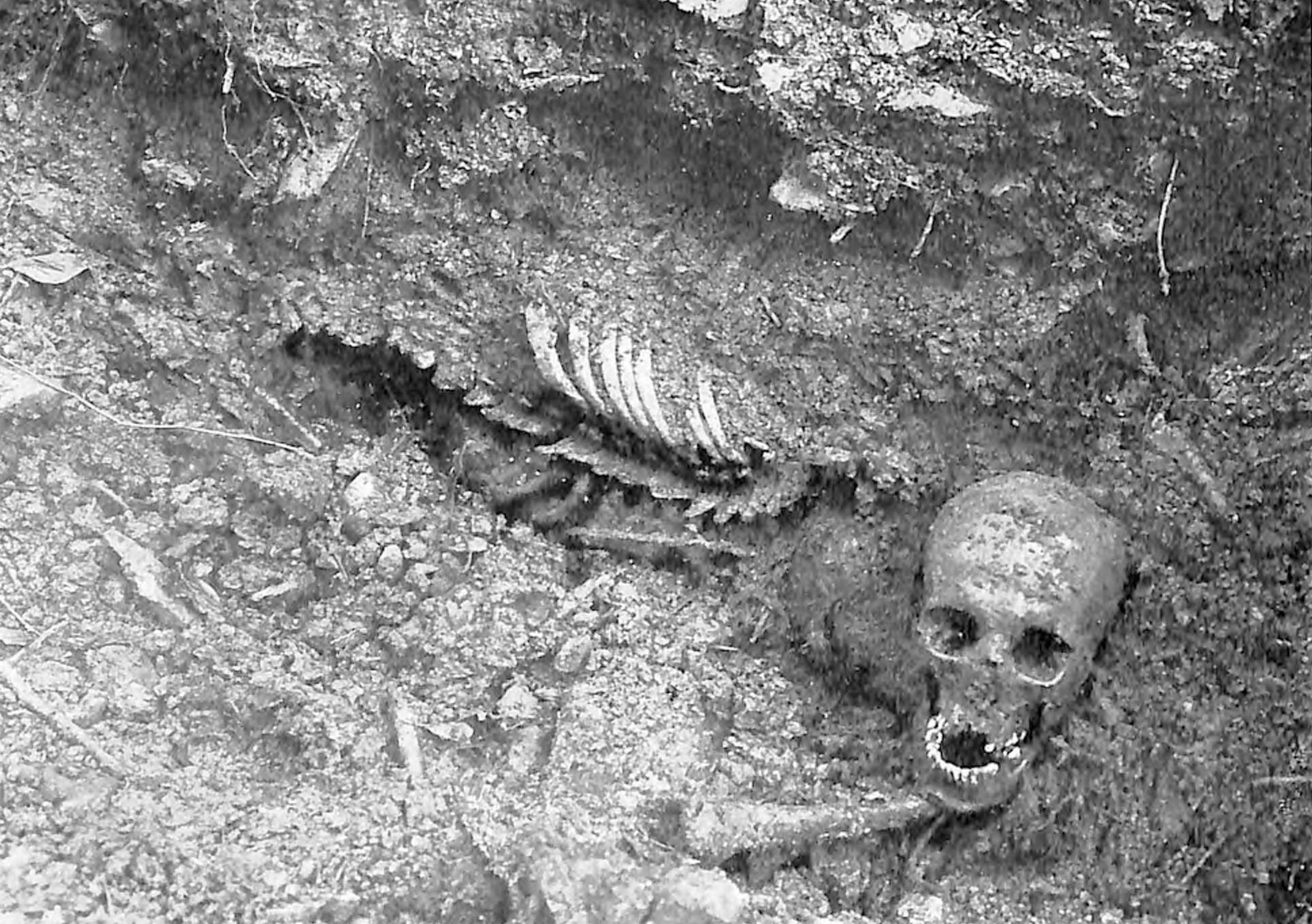
Skeleton from Duboka Dolina

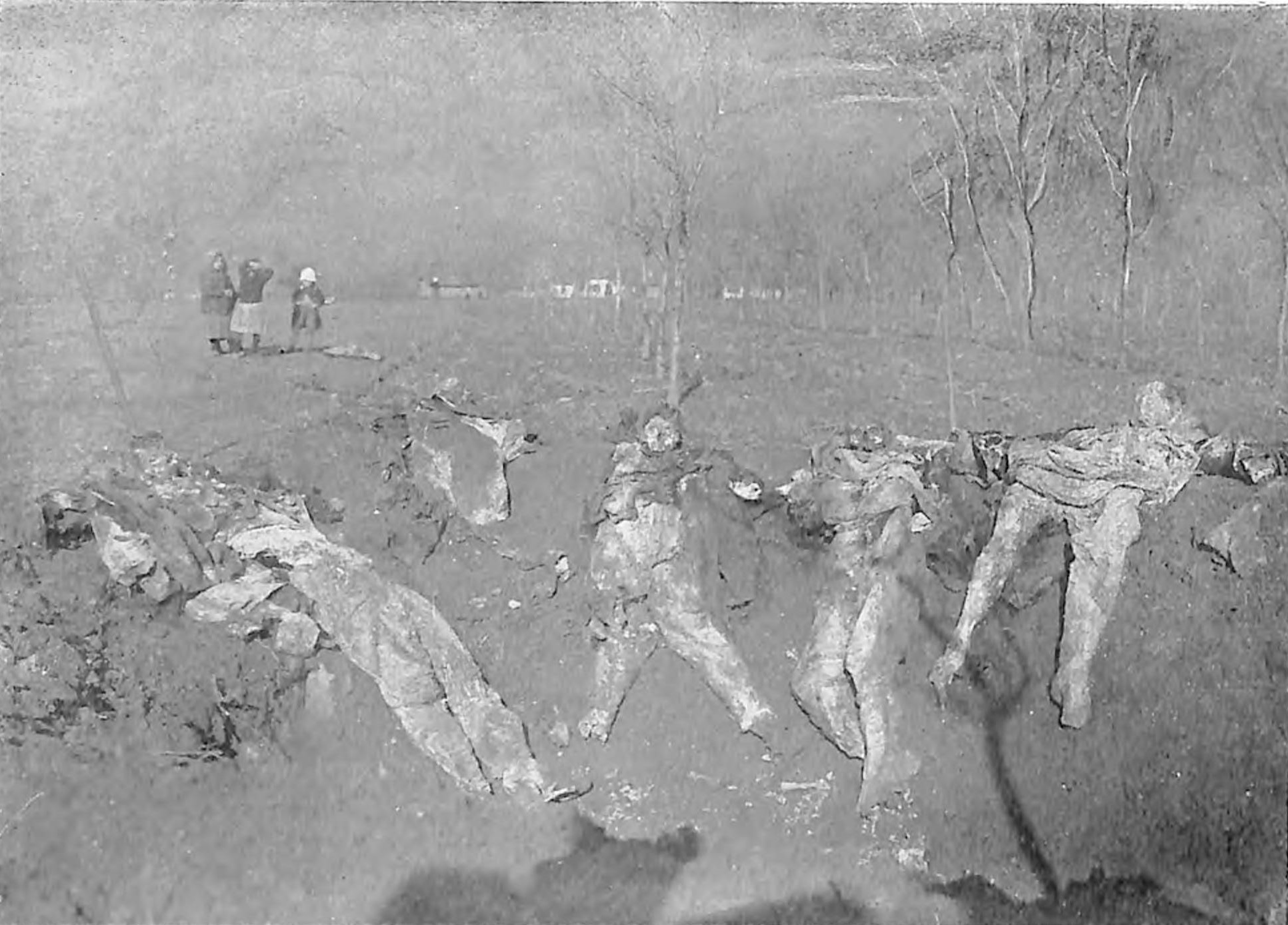
Surdulica massacre victims

== Aftermath ==
The Bulgarian head of the Vranje district described the executed men as "killers, thieves and butchers" whose "[crimes] were so great that at least ten years would be needed to mend their evil". According to Colonel von Lustig, the relatives of those executed in Surdulica had also suffered following the massacre. An American writer named William A. Drayton visited today's North Macedonia region and southern Serbia between December 1918 and January 1919 as part of a Serbian commission investigating Bulgarian war crimes in these regions. Drayton noted in his diary that he interviewed fifteen eyewitnesses who charged that Bulgarian forces deported Serbs to Surdulica and executed a portion of them there in accordance with pre-determined lists of names. The rest, according to the witnesses, actually were deported to Sofia. As a result of the massacre, Surdulica received the nickname "slaughterhouse of Serbs".

== See also ==
- Štip massacre
- Serbianisation

== Sources ==
- Jordan, David (2008). The Balkans, Italy & Africa 1914–1918: From Sarajevo to the Piave and Lake Tanganyika. London: Amber Books. ISBN 978-1-906626-14-3.
- Lewis, Mark (2014). Birth of the New Justice: The Internationalization of Crime and Punishment, 1919–1950. Oxford: Oxford University Press. ISBN 978-0-19-966028-5.
- Mitrović, Andrej (2007). Serbia's Great War, 1914–1918. West Lafayette, Indiana: Purdue University Press. ISBN 978-1-55753-477-4.
- Palmer, Michael A. (2010). The German Wars: A Concise History, 1859–1945. Minneapolis, Minnesota: Zenith Imprint. ISBN 978-1-61673-985-0.
- Pavlowitch, Stevan K. (2002). Serbia: The History of an Idea. New York: New York University Press. ISBN 978-0-8147-6708-5.
- Lazić, Jovana (2024). "Serbia at War". The Routledge History of the First World War. Routledge. ISBN 978-1-0324-2603-7.
- Pisarri, Milovan (2013). "Bulgarian Crimes against Civilians in Occupied Serbia during the First World War". Balcanica (44). Balkanološki institut - Srpska akademija nauka i umetnosti. doi:10.2298/BALC1344357P.
