= Herzegovina (disambiguation) =

Herzegovina is a geographical and historical region in Bosnia and Herzegovina.

Herzegovina or Hercegovina may also refer to:

- East Herzegovina, eastern part of the region of Herzegovina
- Sanjak of Herzegovina, an administrative region of the Ottoman Empire, from 15th to 19th century
- Herzegovina Eyalet, an administrative province of the Ottoman Empire, in 19th century
- Old Herzegovina, part of historical Herzegovina, attached to Montenegro since 1878
- SAO Herzegovina, Serbian Autonomous Oblast (Region) of Herzegovina (1991)
- Herzegovina-Neretva Canton, an administrative unit in Bosnia and Herzegovina
- West Herzegovina Canton, an administrative unit in Bosnia and Herzegovina
- Eparchy of Zahumlje and Herzegovina, a diocese of the Serbian Orthodox Church

== See also ==
- Herzegovina Uprising (disambiguation)
- Herzegovinian (disambiguation)
- Bosnia (disambiguation)
