= Belgrade City Administration (1929–1941) =

1929–1941 administrative district of the Kingdom of Yugoslavia

Belgrade City Administration Управа града Београда Uprava grada Beograda
- District of the Kingdom of Yugoslavia
- 1929–1941
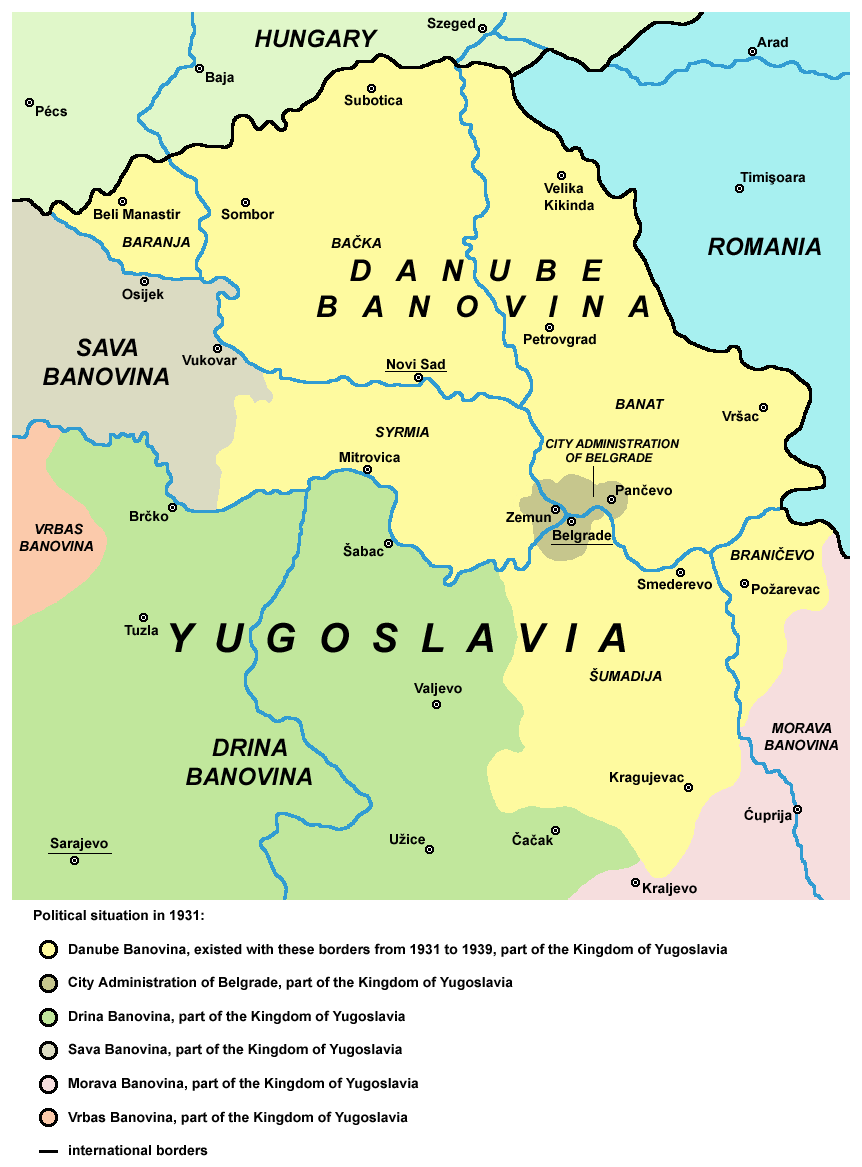
- Belgrade City Administration surrounded by Danube Banovina
- Capital: Belgrade
- History
  - Established: 1929
  - Disestablished: 1941
Preceded by
Belgrade Oblast
Syrmia Oblast
Succeeded by
Belgrade District
Veliki Bečkerek District
Vuka County
- Today part of: Serbia

Belgrade City Administration (Serbian: Управа града Београда, romanized: Uprava grada Beograda), was an administrative district of the Kingdom of Yugoslavia from 1929 to 1941. Its administrative center was Belgrade.

== History ==
The Kingdom of Serbs, Croats and Slovenes was formed in 1918 and was initially divided into counties and districts (1918–1922) and administrative oblasts (1922-1929). In 1929, the name of the country was changed to the Kingdom of Yugoslavia and new administrative units known as banovinas (Serbo-Croatian: banovine, бановине) were introduced. The whole country was divided into 9 banovinas, while the area around the capital Belgrade was organized as a separate district known as the Belgrade City Administration. Before 1929, the territory of the Belgrade City Administration was divided between the Belgrade Oblast and the Syrmia Oblast.

In 1941, following the Axis invasion, occupation and partition of Yugoslavia, the district was abolished and most of its territory was incorporated into the newly formed districts of Belgrade and Veliki Bečkerek within German-occupied Serbia. A smaller part of the district was attached to Vuka County within the Independent State of Croatia.

== Geography ==
The Belgrade City Administration was completely surrounded by the Danube Banovina, whose capital was Novi Sad. The administration included the city of Belgrade, as well as the neighboring cities of Zemun and Pančevo.

== Demographics ==
Inhabitants of the district were mainly Serbs, but members of some other ethnicities (Germans, Hungarians, Croats, etc) were present in the area.
