= Serbian Uprising =

Serbian Uprising can refer to:

- Serbian Uprising of 1594 (in Banat)
- Serbian Uprising of 1596 (in Herzegovina)
- Serbian Uprising of 1737 (in Raška)
- Serbian Uprising of 1788 (in Pomoravlje)
- Serbian Uprising of 1804 (in central Serbia)
- Serbian Uprising of 1814 (in Šumadija)
- Serbian Uprising of 1815 (in central Serbia)
- Serbian Uprising of 1834 (in Bosnia)
- Serbian Uprising of 1841 (in the region of Niš)
- Serbian Uprising of 1848 (in Vojvodina)
- Serbian Uprising of 1875 (in Herzegovina, Bosnia, and Raška)
- Serbian Uprising of 1917 (in Toplica)
- Serbian Uprising of 1941 (in Serbia and other parts of Yugoslavia)

== See also ==
- Srb uprising
- Serbian Revolution
- Serbian-Bulgarian War (disambiguation)
- Serbian-Turkish War (disambiguation)
- Uprising in Bosnia and Herzegovina (disambiguation)
