= Bosniacs =

Bosniacs may refer to:

- as a spelling variant for Bosniaks, an ethnonym designating ethnic Bosniaks
- as a spelling variant for Bosnians, a demonym designating the general population of Bosnia

== See also ==
- Bosniac (disambiguation)
- Name of Bosnia
- Bosnia (disambiguation)
- Bosnian (disambiguation)
- Bosnians (disambiguation)
- Bosniaks (disambiguation)
- Bosniak (disambiguation)
