= Bosniaks (disambiguation) =

The Bosniaks (Bošnjaci (endonym)) are a South Slavic ethnic group from Bosnia and Herzegovina.

Bosniaks may also refer to:

- Bosniaks (Croats in Hungary), a distinctive term for a group of ethnic Croats who migrated to Hungary from Bosnia
- Bosniaks (demonym), demonym, designating the population of Bosnia; same as Bosnians
- Bošnjak (demonym), an archaic demonym, designating the population of Medieval Bosnia

== See also ==
- Bosniak (disambiguation)
- Bosnian (disambiguation)
- Bosnians (disambiguation)
- Bosnia (disambiguation)
- Name of Bosnia
- Bošnjani
