= Bošnjak (surname) =

Origin
- Languages: Bosnian, Croatian, Serbian
- Meaning: Bosniak
- Region of origin: Bosnia and Herzegovina

Other names
- Variant forms: Bosanac; Bošnjaković

Bošnjak (Serbian Cyrillic: Бошњак) is a common surname in Bosnia and Herzegovina, Croatia and Serbia. Etymologically, it is an archaic local demonym denoting people from the region of Bosnia as equivalent to the present-day English term "Bosnian". A closely related surname is Bošnjaković, which is a patronymic derivative of Bošnjak. The surname Bošnjak is carried by 6,731 people in Croatia according to the 2011 census, and as such ranks 28th by frequency. It is one of the most common surnames in three counties of Croatia. In Serbia the surname is carried by 2,042 people, and as such ranks 496th by frequency.

It may refer to:

- Armin Bošnjak (born 1994), Montenegrin footballer
- Branka Bošnjak (born 1956), Serbian architect and politician
- Branko Bošnjak (1923–1996), Croatian philosopher
- Branko Bošnjak (born 1955), Yugoslav footballer
- Bruno Bošnjak (born 1983), Croatian snowboarder
- Domagoj Bošnjak (born 1995), Croatian Basketball player
- Dragan Bošnjak (1956–2019), Serbian footballer
- Dražen Bošnjak, American composer
- Ernest Bošnjak (1876–1963), Yugoslavian cameraman, film director and printer
- Ivan Bošnjak (born 1974), Serbian politician
- Ivan Bošnjak (footballer) (born 1979), Croatian footballer
- Ivan Bošnjak (born 1982), Serbian basketball player
- Jim Bosnjak, Croatian-Australian businessman and chairman of Westbus, Australia's largest privately owned bus operator
- Marko Bošnjak (musician), Bosnian Croat singer-songwriter
- Marko Bošnjak (judge), Slovenian jurist
- Marko Bošnjak (basketball player), Bosnia and Herzegovina player, with KK Vrijednosnice Osijek
- Marko Bošnjak (banker), vice-governor of the Bank of Slovenia, Appointments by the 8th National Assembly of the Republic of Slovenia
- Matea Bošnjak (born 1997), Croatian footballer
- Petar Bošnjak (born 1974), Croatian footballer
- Predrag Bošnjak (born 1985), Hungarian footballer of Serbian descent
- Spomenko Bošnjak (born 1973), Bosnian Croat footballer
- Strahinja Bošnjak (born 1999), Serbian footballer

== See also ==
- Boshnak, surname
- Bošnjaković, surname
- Bosanac (surname)
