= Bošnjak =

Bosniak or Bošnjak may refer to:

- Bosniak (ethnonym) – Bošnjak, a South Slavic ethnonym, designating a Bosniak as a person of Bosniak ethnicity
- Bosniak (demonym) – Bošnjak, a South Slavic demonym, designating a Bosniak as a person from the region of Bosnia
- Bošnjak (demonym) – Bošnjak, a South Slavic archaic demonym, designating a Bosniak as a person from Medieval Bosnia
- Bosniak language, variant designation for language of ethnic Bosniaks
- Bosniak classification of kidney cysts, a medical term, named after Morton Bosniak
- Bošnjak (surname), a South Slavic surname found mostly in Bosnia and Herzegovina, Croatia, Montenegro and Serbia
- Bošnjak, Petrovac, a village near Petrovac, in Serbia
- Mali Bošnjak, a village near Koceljeva, in Serbia
- Bosnjaci, a village near Lovreć, Imotski, in Croatia
- Bošnjaci (Hungarian: Bosnyáki), a village and municipality in Vukovar-Syrmia County, in Croatia
- Bošnjak (newspaper), Bosnian newspaper from 1891

== See also ==
- Bosniaks (disambiguation)
- Bosnians (disambiguation)
- Bosnian (disambiguation)
- Bosnia (disambiguation)
- Name of Bosnia
