= Bosnians (disambiguation) =

Bosnians, citizens of Bosnia and Herzegovina or people who identify as Bosnians on an interethnic basis.

Bosnians may also refer to:

- Bosnian Bosniaks, people from Bosnia and Herzegovina who identify as ethnic Bosniaks (mainly Muslims)
- Bosnian Croats, people from Bosnia and Herzegovina who identify as ethnic Croats (mainly Catholic Christians)
- Bosnian Serbs, people from Bosnia and Herzegovina who identify as ethnic Serbs (mainly Eastern Orthodox Christians)

== See also ==
- Name of Bosnia
- Bosnia and Herzegovina
- Bosnia (disambiguation)
- Bosnian (disambiguation)
- Bosniak (disambiguation)
- Bosniaks (disambiguation)
