= Asinarius =

Ostrogothic military commander

Asinarius was an Ostrogothic military commander during Justinian’s Gothic War.

In 536 he and Gripas led an invasion into Dalmatia with the goal of capturing the Salona where they defeated the Byzantine commander Mauricius, who they killed, but were in turn defeated by Mundus, Mauricius’ father, who died in the chase. After the loss of their leader the Byzantines retreated while tribes who had stayed away from Byzantine lands out of fear of Mundus invaded the Balkans. The Ostrogoths, however, had also retreated after the battle. He and Uligisalus were later ordered to mobilise the Suevi allied forces and invade Dalmatia again with a combined Suevi–Gothic force. While Asinarius mobilised, the Suevi Uligisalus moved ahead into the Balkans where he was defeated in the Battle of Scardon. Hearing of Asinarius' approach with the Suevi allies, the Byzantine commander Constantinianus decided to retreat to Salona where he prepared the defences. Arriving at Salona the Gothic army and fleet under Asinarius and Uligisalus surrounded the city and laid siege to it. A sally by the Byzantine navy defeated the Gothic navy and kept the sea route into the city open.
