= Siege of Salona (537) =

Battle during Justinian's Gothic War

- Part of the Gothic War (535–554)
- First phase of the Gothic War campaigns
Date	February – summer 537 AD
Location	Salona, Dalmatia 43°32′22″N 16°28′59″E
Result	Byzantine victory
Territorial changes	Byzantines captured and defended Salona

Belligerents
Byzantine Empire	Ostrogothic Kingdom

Commanders and leaders
Constantinianus	Asinarius; Uligisalus

Strength
Unknown (Note: The Byzantine Illyrian army was composed on paper of 36,200 infantry, 1,000 cavalry, 6,000 auxilia palatina, as well as foederati and bucellarii forces. While Gripas panicked upon learning a large Byzantine force landed to reclaim Salona, leaving the city undefended, historian Ilkka Syvänne notes that Procopius may have emphasized the discrepancy in army size between Belisarius and Constantinianus.)	Unknown

The siege of Salona took place in February 537 AD during the Gothic War (535–554), where Ostrogoths (Goths) attempted to seize the city of Salona, controlled by the Byzantine Empire.

In 535 AD, Salona was captured by Byzantine forces for its strategic position for supply lines across the Adriatic Sea to the war campaign on the Italian Peninsula. The Goths attempted to recapture the city with a large army, but it ended as a Pyrrhic victory for the Byzantines, with heavy losses for both sides. Another Byzantine army under the command of the general Constantinianus secured the region in March 536. Early in the following year, the Goths gathered a second army, accompanied by a navy, and attacked the city in an attempt to regain control of the region.

The Byzantines defeated the Gothic navy, securing the city's sea supply lines during the siege. Moreover, the city's fortifications and determined defenders prevented a Gothic breakthrough by land. The Goths were unable to maintain the siege and withdrew. The failure to capture Salona ensured continued Byzantine control of Dalmatia region and supported further imperial campaigns in the Italian Peninsula.

== Prelude ==
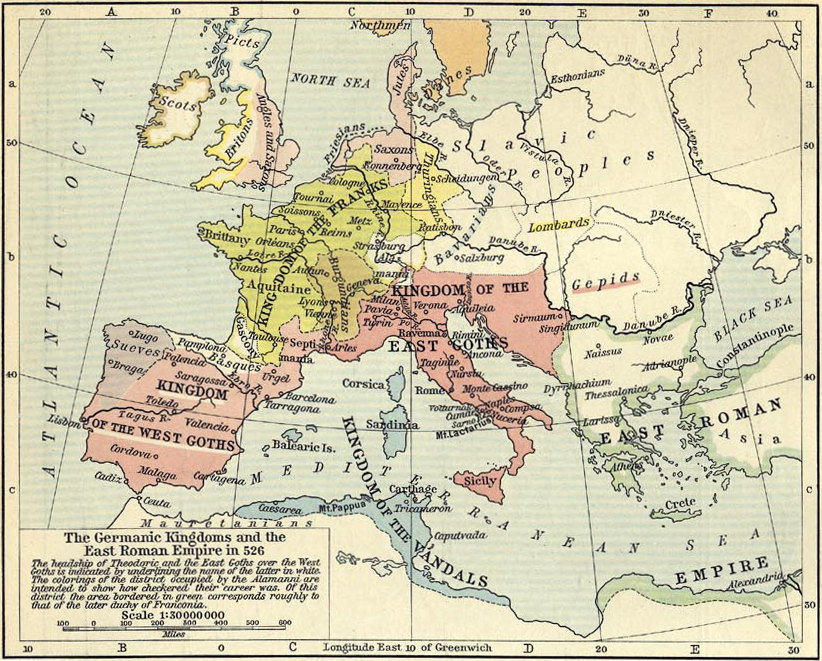
Map of the East Roman Empire (Byzantine Empire) and the Germanic kingdoms of the western Mediterranean in 526

The Gothic War began as part of Byzantine Emperor Justinian's goal to restore former Western Roman territories to Byzantine control. It started with the successful reconquest of North Africa in the Vandalic War (533–534). In early 535, tensions in the Gothic kingdom escalated following the assassination of Queen Amalasuntha, who had maintained good relations with the Byzantines and even considered handing her kingdom over to them, and were further weakened by internal leadership struggles that continued under King Theodahad. Justinian used Amalasuntha's death as a diplomatic pretext for military intervention. He first dispatched Mundus, the general (Magister Militum) of Illyricum region, to seize Salona, the capital of Dalmatia region, and sent General Belisarius to invade Sicily. The Goths struggled to resist these multi-front offensives, as Justinian had also secured an alliance with the Franks, who sought to expand into Gothic territories.

Mundus captured Salona, and in response, the Goths assembled an army under Asinarius and Gripas to retake the city. As this army approached the city, Mundus sent his son Mauricius on a reconnaissance mission; however, in a skirmish, Mauricius died. Mundus, being grief-stricken upon the news, marched against the Goths, where he decisively routed them, but he also died in pursuit of the routed Gothic forces. The leaderless Byzantine forces did not return to Salona and instead went home. The Goths, having suffered considerable losses, retreated to nearby forts and did not try to secure Salona as they considered it difficult to hold with its inhabitants being hostile to them.

Upon the news about the events in Dalmatia, Theodahad detained the Byzantine ambassadors in close confinement. In response, Justinian sent Constantinianus, his cavalry commander (Count of the Stable), to recover Dalmatia. He sailed from Dyrrhachium to Ragusa, after which he easily captured Salona in March 536 since the Goths had retreated upon learning that a large Byzantine force landed in Dalmatia. Constantinianus started repairing the walls, which were in disrepair. At the same time, Belisarius marched from Sicily to southern Italy capturing Naples and many other regions, which welcomed the Byzantines. In December of 536, he entered Rome unopposed, returning the city under Byzantine control after sixty years.

The Byzantine successes led the Goths to turn against their king, who was soon deposed and later killed. The newly crowned king, Vitiges, started to galvanize the Goths and create a large army against the Byzantines. Before marching against Rome, Vitiges sent an army under Asinarius and Uligisalus to recover Dalmatia. He also sent with them a large number of warships, presumably the royal fleet of Ravenna, with the intention to blockade and besiege the city from the seaside.

== Military actions ==
=== Battle of Scardon ===
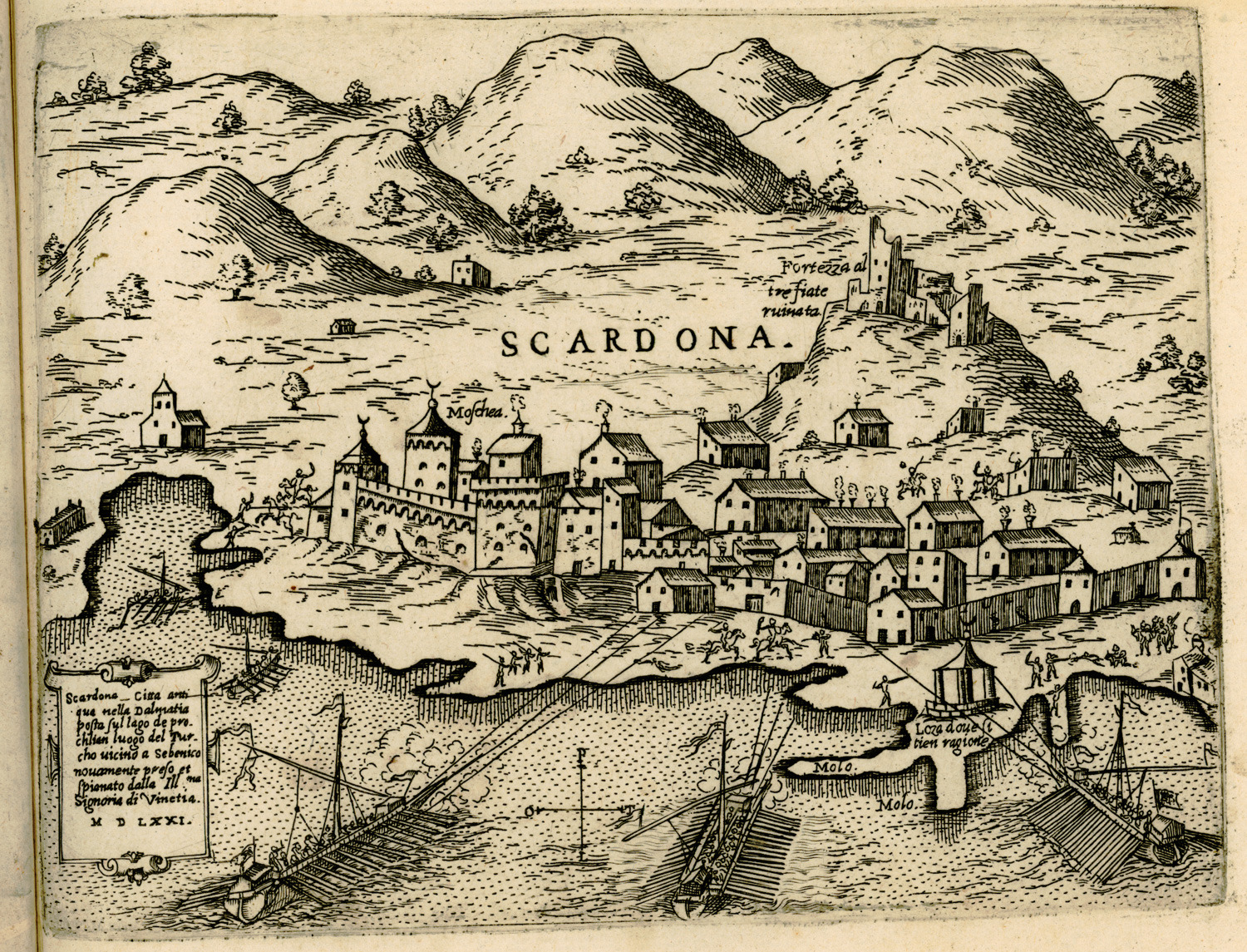
Sketch of Skradon in 1574, capturing the topography of the area

Asinarius went to raise the Suevi and other local tribes in the Pannonia region. However, Uligisalus advanced alone into the Liburnia region, where he was defeated by Constantianus near the town of Scardon. Uligisalus retreated to the city of Burnus to await the arrival of Asinarius. When Constantianus learned that Asinarius was approaching with a large force, he realized that he did not have sufficient troops against the combined Gothic army. He withdrew his troops, including those from nearby outposts, into Salona and reinforced its fortifications for siege, including digging a moat around the circuit wall.

=== Siege ===
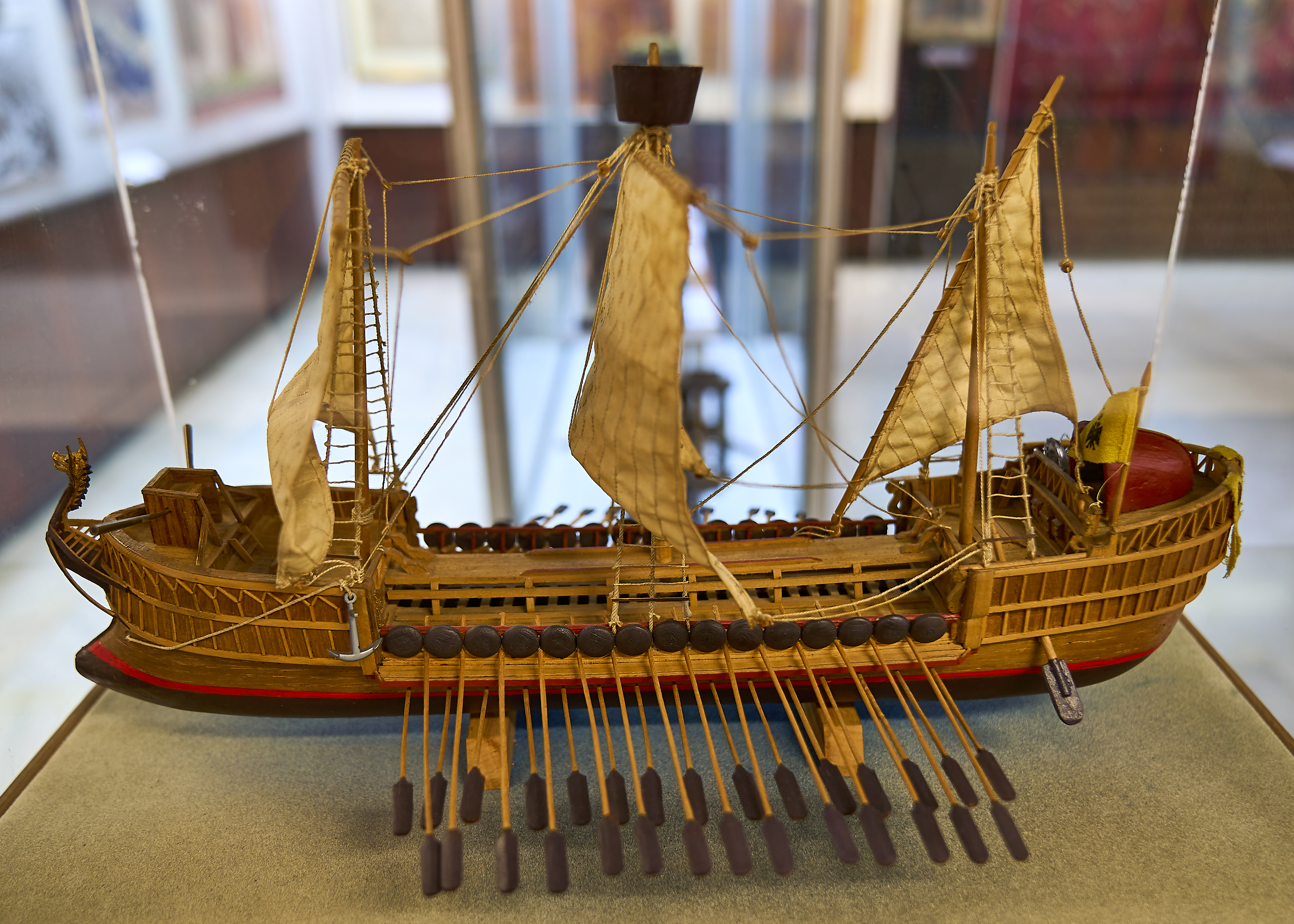
Model of a Byzantine warship (dromon) at Athens War Museum

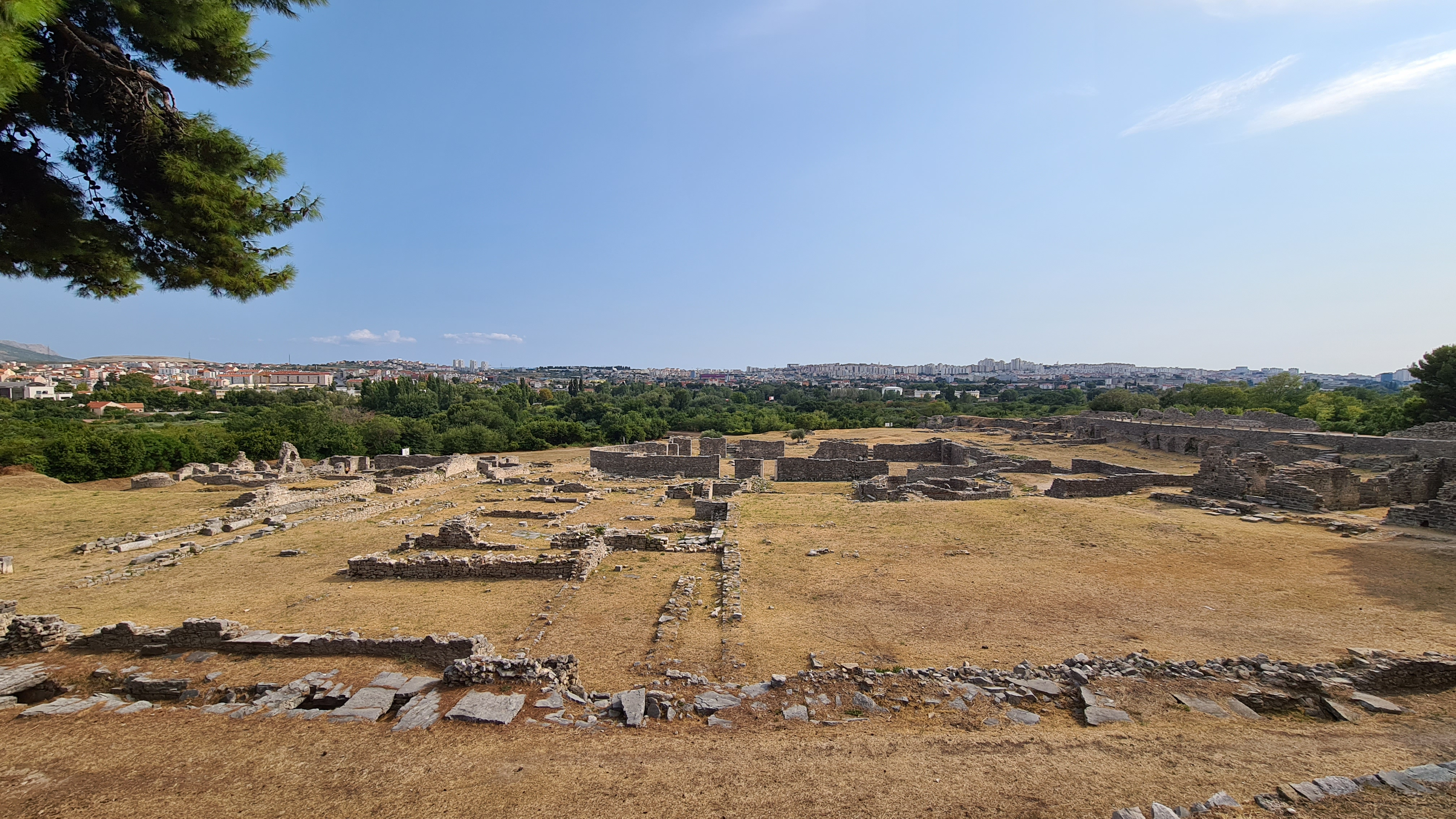
Part of the Salona ruins.

Asinarius arrived at Burnus with numerous tribes; the commanders united their forces and advanced on Salona. Upon arrival in February 537, they dug a ditch and built a stockade around the city, while the Gothic fleet blockaded the harbor, completing the encirclement. After a while, the Byzantines attempted a sortie with their fleet and defeated the Goths at sea by sinking and capturing many of those ships. Historian Ilkka Syvänne attributes this victory to the superior naval skills of the Byzantines over the Goths. Despite this loss, the Goths did not immediately lift the siege. Although contemporary historian Procopius does not describe the siege's end, Constantianus's defense succeeded, because the blockade became impossible after the naval defeat. The siege probably ended in the summer of 537.

== Aftermath ==
The successful defense is evident from Constantianus's later appointment to replace Belisarius as the commander-in-chief of Byzantine troops in the Italian Peninsula after the fall of Ravenna in 540. Even though Constantinianus's participation in the first phase of the Gothic War (535–540) was limited in Dalmatia, his presence kept an additional open front for the Goths to remain divided. Specifically, they had garrisons south of Gaul under Marcias to prevent any potential intrusions from the Franks, and others stationed in Venetia to oppose Constantianus. The majority of the troops were gathered into a large army under Vitiges, who marched south to recapture Rome from Belisarius, leading to a long siege that became the highlight of the first phase of the Gothic War.

== See also ==
- Byzantine navy

== Sources ==
=== Primary ===
- Procopius (1914) [545–553 AD]. Procopius: History of the Wars, Books V and VI. Translated by Bronson Dewing, Henry. Cambridge, MA: Harvard University Press.

=== Secondary ===
- Bury, John Bagnell (1958). History of the Later Roman Empire: From the Death of Theodosius I to the Death of Justinian. Vol. 2. Mineola, New York: Dover Publications, Inc.
- Heather, Peter J. (2018). Rome Resurgent: War and Empire in the Age of Justinian. Oxford: Oxford University Press. ISBN 9780199362745.
- Hughes, Ian (2009). Belisarius: The Last Roman General. Yardley, PA: Westholme Publishing. ISBN 9781594160851. OCLC 294885267.
- Syvänne, Ilkka (2021). Military History of Late Rome 518–565. Yorkshire, PA: Pen and Sword Military. ISBN 978-1-4738-9530-0.
