= Gripas =

Ostrogothic military commander

Gripas was an Ostrogothic military commander. During the Gothic War of Justinian I, he and Asinarius led an invasion into Dalmatia trying to capturing Salona. They defeated their Byzantine opponent Mauricius and killed him but were defeated by his father Mundus. Mundus died however and his army retreated but so did the Goths. As the Byzantine army was reforming under Constantinianus Gripas led a Gothic force to Salona, successfully capturing it. After hearing of reports emphasising the large size of Byzantine force moving towards him he retreated. After retaking the city Constantinianus had its defences rebuilt. Seeing his position was desperate Gripas returned to Ravenna.
