= Bošnjaković =

Bošnjaković (Serbian Cyrillic: Бошњаковић) is a family name found in Bosnia and Herzegovina, Croatia and Serbia. It may refer to:

- Dražen Bošnjaković (born 1961), Croatia's Minister of Justice 2010–2011
- Branko Bošnjaković (born 1939), Dutch-Croatian physicist, son of Fran Bošnjaković
- Fran Bošnjaković (1902–1993), Croatian engineer
- Milenko Bošnjaković (born 1968), Bosnian football manager

== See also ==
- Bošnjak (surname)
