= Bosanac =

Origin
- Languages: Bosnian, Croatian, Serbian
- Meaning: Bosnian
- Region of origin: Bosnia and Herzegovina

Other names
- Variant form: Bošnjak

Bosanac (Serbian Cyrillic: Босанац, lit. 'Bosnian') is a South Slavic surname.

Through migration, the name can be found in the United Kingdom and Australia.

Notable people with the surname include:

- Bosco Bosanac, Australian bassist of The Atlantics
- Gordan Bosanac (born 1973), Croatian politician
- Tomo Bosanac (1918–2003), Croatian electrical engineering professor, member of the Croatian Academy of Sciences and Arts
- Vesna Bosanac (1949–2022), Croatian physician involved in the Battle of Vukovar

== See also ==
- Bošnjak (surname)
- Besanko (Бесанко)
- Bosanko (Босанко)
