= Bosna =

Bosna may refer to:

== Places ==
- Bosna, Edirne
- Bosna, Kansas, United States
- Bosna-Serai or Sarajevo, Bosnia and Herzegovina
- Bosna village, Bulgaria
- Bosnia (early medieval)
- Bosnia (region) (Serbo-Croatian Latin: Bosna),
- Bosnia and Herzegovina (Serbo-Croatian Latin: Bosna i Hercegovina), a country in southern Europe

== Geographical features ==
- Bosna (ridge), a mountain ridge in Bulgaria
- Bosna (river), a river in Bosnia and Herzegovina

== Other uses ==
- Air Bosna or B&H Airlines, out of Sarajevo, Bosnia and Herzegovina
- Bosna (sausage), a spicy Austrian fast-food dish
- Special Police Squad "Bosna", a special forces unit in Bosnia and Herzegovina
- USD Bosna, a Bosnian Sport organization and multisport club, including a list of teams

== See also ==
- Bosnäs, Borås Municipality, Västra Götaland County, Sweden
- Bosnia (disambiguation)
