= Uligisalus =

Uligisalus was a Gothic military commander during Justinian's Gothic War.

Historical accounts cited him as one of the two commanders sent by Witigis to recover Dalmatia for the Goths. The other commander was Asinarius, who stopped to gather a barbarian army upon reaching Savia while Uligisalus continued to engage the enemy at Scardon. He was defeated by Constantinianus at the Battle of Scardon. Uligisalus retreated to the city of Burnum, where he waited for Asinarius. The army, however, failed and this loss marked the end of the Goths' domination over the region while Savia fell to the Lombards and Noricum to the Franks. Dalmatia, on the other hand, became a Byzantine stronghold, serving as a staging ground for its campaigns in Italy.

Uligisalus was later employed as the commander of the 400-man garrison of Tudera.
