= Via Argentaria =

Roman and medieval trade route

The Via Argentaria (Latin for the "Silver Way") was a Roman and medieval trade route through the Dinaric Alps. It was named after the Roman silver that was transported between the mint in Salona, the silver mines east of Ilidža and in Srebrenica, and the mint in Sirmium. At the south end, it connected the areas of today's Solin and Split, northeastwards through the Dinaric Alps starting at Klis and Sinj, with central Bosnia, turning northward along the Drina and connecting today's Sremska Mitrovica.

== Sources ==
- Goldstein, Ivo (2003). Hrvatska povijest. Novi Liber.
- Šebečić, Berislav (December 2002). "Srebreni putevi u Europi početkom novog vijeka i rudarsko-financijski imperiji Fuggerovih" [Silver routes in Europe at the beginning of new age and the Fuggers' mining-financial empires]. The Mining-geological-petroleum Engineering Bulletin (in Croatian). 14 (1). Faculty of mining, geology and petroleum engineering, University of Zagreb.
