= Constantinianus =

6th-century Byzantine general in the Gothic War

- Military career
- Allegiance: Byzantine Empire
- Rank: Comes sacri stabvli (536–544?); Magister utriusque militae (549–562); Honorary consul (553); Patrikios (562)
- Conflicts: Gothic War (535–554); Siege of Salona (537); Siege of Verona (541); Battle of Faventia (542)

Constantinianus (also Constantianus or Constantinian; Ancient Greek: Κωνσταντινιανός, Kōnstantinianós) was a Byzantine military commander during the reign of Emperor Justinian I (r. 527–565).

He played an active role in the first phase of the Gothic War (535–554), during which he was sent to take Salona in Dalmatia after the death of the previous general Mundus. He captured and fortified the city, successfully defending it against a large Gothic army by breaking the naval blockade and keeping supply lines open. He remained in the region until about 540.

Later, he took part in operations in Italy, but poor coordination with other commanders led to losses, and he was eventually replaced by Belisarius. In subsequent years, Constantinianus was involved in campaigns in the Balkans against the Slavs and in investigations of conspiracies against the emperor as he had become a trusted imperial adviser.

== History ==
The early history of Constantinianus is not known. According to historian John R. Martindale, he received the title of comes sacri stabvli (των βασιλικών ιπποκόμων ήρχεν) probably from 536 AD until 544. Later, he was one of Byzantine Emperor Justinian I's trusted advisers in the royal court.

=== Capture of Salona ===
Operations during the first five years of the war, featuring the conquest of Italy directed by Belisarius and Dalmatia by Mundus and Constantinianus

At the beginning of the Gothic War (535–554), Justinian dispatched Mundus, the Magister Militum per Illyricum, to seize Salona in Dalmatia in 535, while Belisarius with a smaller army was sent to seize control of Sicily, Italy. Mundus succeeded in his task and the Goths attempted to recapture the city from him with a large army. This ended in a Pyrrhic victory for the Byzantines, with heavy losses on both sides, including Mundus. The Byzantine army returned to their home territories, leaving Salona undefended. Justinian then ordered Constantinianus to assemble an army and retake Salona.

Constantinianus sailed from Dyrrhachium to Ragusa. He easily captured Salona in March 536, as the Goths had retreated upon learning that a large Byzantine force landed in Dalmatia. Constantinianus started restoring the walls, which were in disrepair. At the same time, Belisarius marched from Sicily to southern Italy capturing Naples and many other regions that welcomed the Byzantines. In December 536, he entered Rome unopposed, returning the city to Byzantine control after sixty years.

=== Defending Salona ===
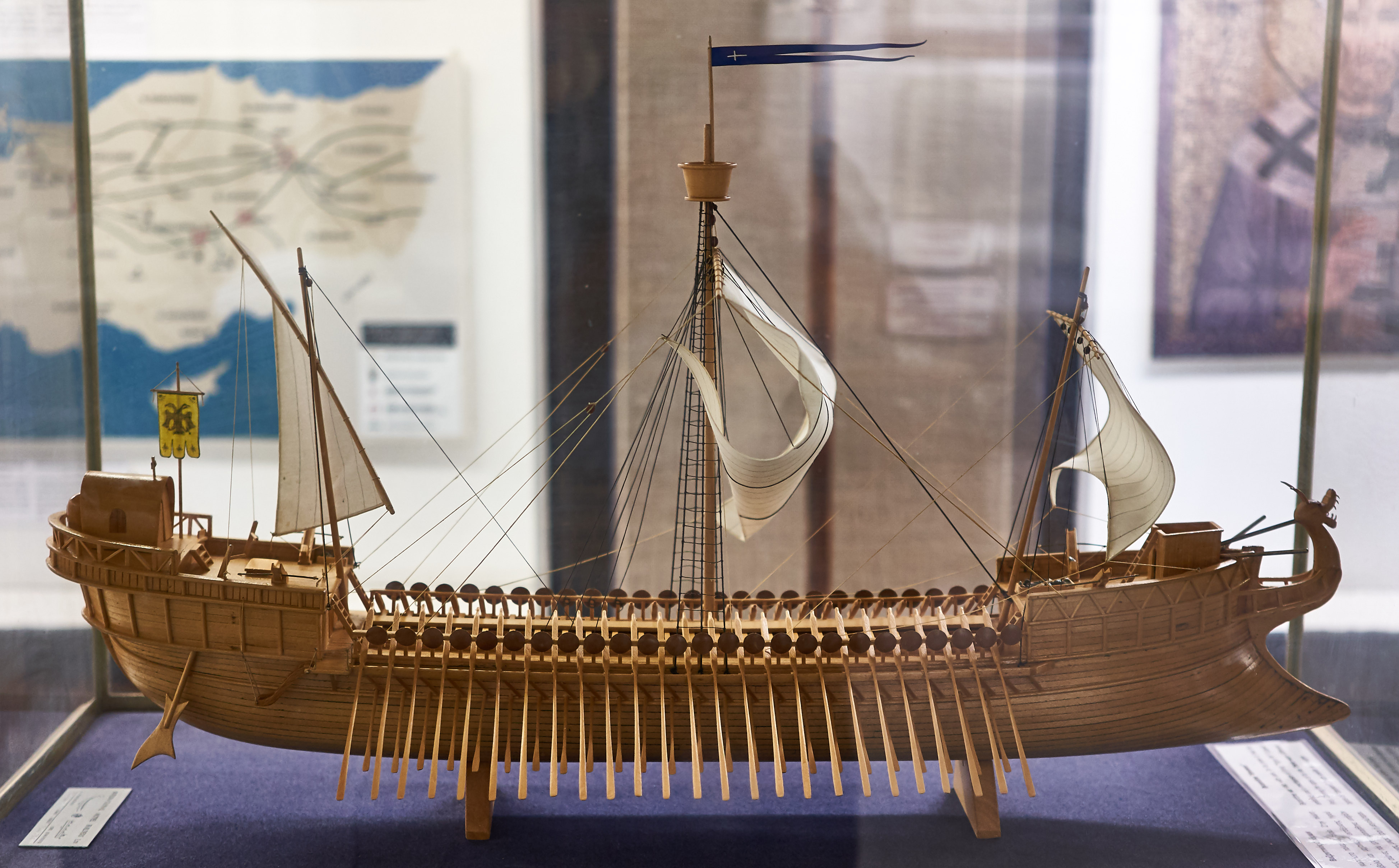
Model of a Byzantine warship (dromon) with oars, located at the Athens War Museum

The Byzantine successes led the Goths to turn against their king, who was soon deposed and later killed. The newly crowned king, Vitiges, started to galvanize the Goths and create a large army to fight the Byzantines. Before marching against Rome, Vitiges sent an army under Asinarius and Uligisalus to recover Dalmatia. He sent with them a large number of warships, presumably the royal fleet of Ravenna, with the intention of blockading and besieging the city from the seaside.

Asinarius went to raise the Suevi and other local tribes in the region of Pannonia. However, Uligisalus advanced alone into Liburnia, where he was defeated by Constantinianus at the Battle of Scardon. Uligisalus retreated to the city of Burnus to await the arrival of Asinarius. When Constantinianus learned that Asinarius was approaching with a large force, he realized that he did not have sufficient troops against the combined Gothic army. He withdrew his troops, including those from nearby outposts, into Salona and reinforced its fortifications for siege, including digging a moat around the circuit wall.

Asinarius arrived at Burnus with numerous tribes; the commanders united their forces and advanced to besiege Salona. Upon arrival in February 537, they dug a ditch and built a stockade around the city, while the Gothic fleet blockaded the harbor, completing the encirclement. After a while, the Byzantines attempted a sortie with their fleet and defeated the Goths at sea by sinking and capturing many of those ships. Despite this loss, the Goths did not immediately lift the siege. Although contemporary historian Procopius does not describe the siege's end, Constantinianus's defense succeeded, because the blockade became impossible after the naval defeat. The siege probably ended in the summer of 537. Constantinianus remained in Dalmatia until 540.

=== Administration of Italy and Gothic resurgence ===
Main army movements during the second phase of the Gothic War

In 540, Belisarius succeeded in capturing Ravenna, the capital of the Ostrogothic kingdom, effectively recovering all the territories of the Italian Peninsula south of the Po River. Belisarius was then recalled to Constantinople taking Ravenna's treasury and Vitigis as prisoner, as he was needed to take command of the eastern borders against the Persians for the upcoming Lazic War (541–562). Justinian replaced Belisarius with Constantinianus along with Bessas and John the Sanguinary with equal authority. However, Constantinianus did not have either the authority or the willingness to assert his command as being more senior than the other two.

The rivalry and corruption between the three commanders led to indiscipline and plundering of the Italian countryside. Moreover, Justinian's harsh tax audit to recover alleged Gothic-era arrears, combined with reduced rewards for wounded and distinguished soldiers, further alienated troops and civilians, collapsing morale and eroding Italian loyalty.

Byzantine misrule strengthened the Goths under Ildibad, who defeated a Byzantine force at the Battle of Treviso and recovered much of the Po Valley. His short reign ended in his assassination before he had consolidated his power. The reign of Eraric followed, but it ended with his murder in late 541, because he secretly offered to abdicate and offer the kingdom to the Byzantines in exchange for the rank of patrician and a large payment. Through the turmoil among the Gothic aristocracy, Ildibad's nephew Totila became king. Reprimanded by Justinian for inaction to exploit Gothic disunity, the Byzantine commanders assembled and decided to capture Verona. However, their divided leadership failed to capture the city in the Siege of Verona.

Totila had continued successes against the Byzantines in Faventia and in Mucellium due to poor leadership and the low morale among the Byzantine army. After the battle of Faventia, Constantinianus returned to Ravenna and did not participate in the siege of Florence or in the Battle of Mucellium. In 543, Constantinianus supported the other commanders in Italy in a letter to Justinian, claiming that it was impossible to continue the war against Totila due to the lack of supplies and low morale among the troops. Justinian brought back Belisarius from the eastern front, replacing Constantinianus. Beyond this point, there are no records of Constantinianus in Italy.

=== Later stage ===
In 548, Constantinianus was in Constantinople, where at the time Germanus (cousin of the emperor) had become an influential figure second only to Justinian. Germanus's stature was challenged by a conspiracy against the emperor which was hatched by the disaffected general Artabanes. The conspirators thought that Germanus was amenable to their plans and first told his son, Justin, who informed his father. Germanus first met the conspirators in person to find out more of their intentions and then informed Constantinianus and Bouzes. Once the plot reached the emperor, the conspirators were arrested but suspicions fell on Germanus as well. Constantinianus defended Germanus.

The following year, Constantinianus, along with Bouzes and Aratius, was given command of a cavalry detachment over 10,000-strong. At this point, Constantinianus got promoted to magister utriusque militae which is equivalent to an army general. They were dispatched to assist the Lombards against the Gepids and Heruls. They remained in Illyricum after the Lombards and Gepids made peace, so that they could protect the region from possible raids from Gepids and Heruls. In 551, Constantinianus was sent under the general Scholasticus to confront an army of Slavs that was plundering the Balkan Peninsula. In the first major engagement near Adrianopolis, the Byzantines were defeated, and Constantinianus's standards were captured. They reorganized, and in a later engagement, they recovered the standards and defeated the Slavs, who returned home afterwards.

In 562, Constantinianus and Marinus conducted an investigation into another conspiracy against the emperor.

== Sources ==
=== Primary ===
- Procopius (1914) [545–553 AD]. Procopius: History of the Wars, Books V and VI. Translated by Bronson Dewing, Henry. Cambridge, MA: Harvard University Press.
- Procopius (1924) [545–553 AD]. Procopius: History of the Wars, Books VI and VII. Translated by Bronson Dewing, Henry. Cambridge, Massachusetts: Harvard University Press.

=== Secondary ===
- Bury, John Bagnell (1958). History of the Later Roman Empire: From the Death of Theodosius I to the Death of Justinian. Vol. 2. Mineola, New York: Dover Publications, Inc. OCLC 1046522911.
- Heather, Peter J. (2018). Rome Resurgent: War and Empire in the Age of Justinian. Oxford: Oxford University Press. ISBN 9780199362745.
- Hughes, Ian (2009). Belisarius: The Last Roman General. Yardley, PA: Westholme Publishing. ISBN 9781594160851. OCLC 294885267.
- Martindale, John R. (1992). The Prosopography of the Later Roman Empire 2 Part Set: Volume 3, AD 527-641. Cambridge University Press. ISBN 978-0-521-20160-5.
- Parnell, David Alan (2017). Justinian's Men, Careers and Relationships of Byzantine Army Officers, 518–610. London: Palgrave Macmillan. doi:10.1057/978-1-137-56204-3. ISBN 978-1-349-85084-6.
- Syvänne, Ilkka (2021). Military History of Late Rome 518–565. Yorkshire, PA: Pen and Sword Military. ISBN 978-1-4738-9530-0.
