= Ernest Bošnjak =

Yugoslavian cameraman, film director and printer

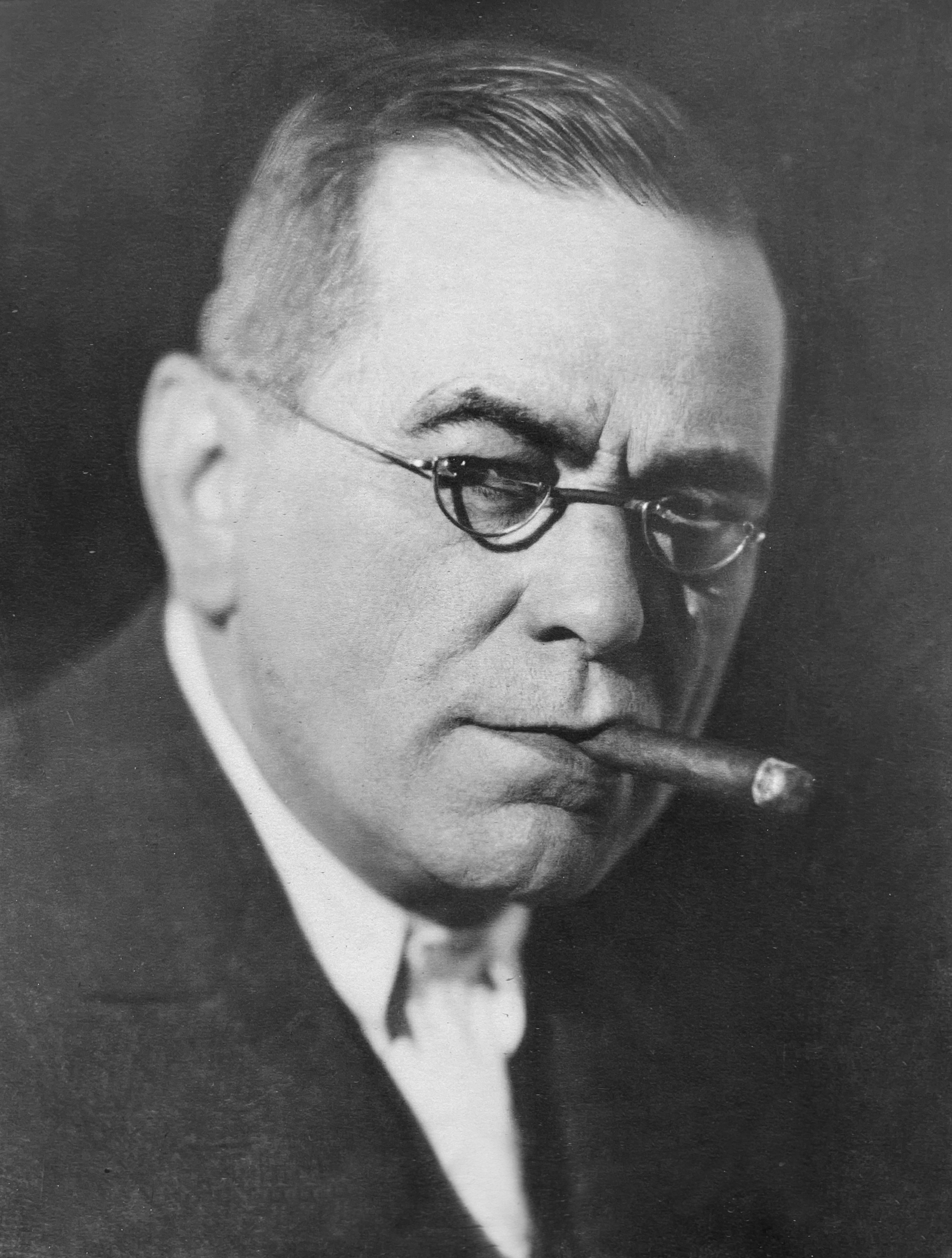
- Born: January 2, 1876; Sombor, Austria-Hungary
- Died: August 9, 1963 (aged 87); Sombor, Yugoslavia
- Resting place: The Great Catholic Cemetery, Sombor, Vojvodina, Republic of Serbia
- Years active: 1906 -1932
- Spouse: Irén Bošnjak

Signature
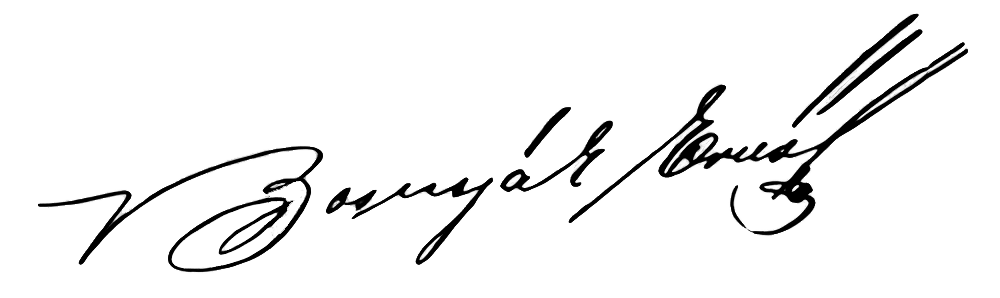

Ernest Bošnjak (Hungarian: Ernő Bosnyák; Zombor, Austria-Hungary 2 January 1876 – Sombor, Yugoslavia 9 August 1963) was an Austro-Hungarian and later Yugoslav cameraman, film director and printer. One of the founders of the filmography in Vojvodina. He was of Bunjevac origin.
