= Besanko =

Besanko is a surname. Notable people with the surname include:

- Anthony Besanko (born 1954), judge of the Federal Court of Australia
- Barry Besanko (born 1956), Australian rules footballer and sprinter
- Neil Besanko (born 1951), Australian rules footballer
- Peter Besanko (born 1955), Australian racing cyclist
- Robert Besanko (born 1951), Australian Photographer
