= Bošnjak, Serbia =

Bošnjak Бошњак
- Village
- Location within Serbia
- Coordinates: 44°22′20″N 21°18′39″E
- Country: Serbia
- District: Braničevo District
- Municipality: Petrovac na Mlavi
- Time zone: UTC+1 (CET)
  - Summer (DST): UTC+2 (CEST)

Bošnjak is a village situated in Petrovac na Mlavi municipality in Serbia.
