= Branko Bošnjaković =

Dutch-Croatian physicist (born 1939)

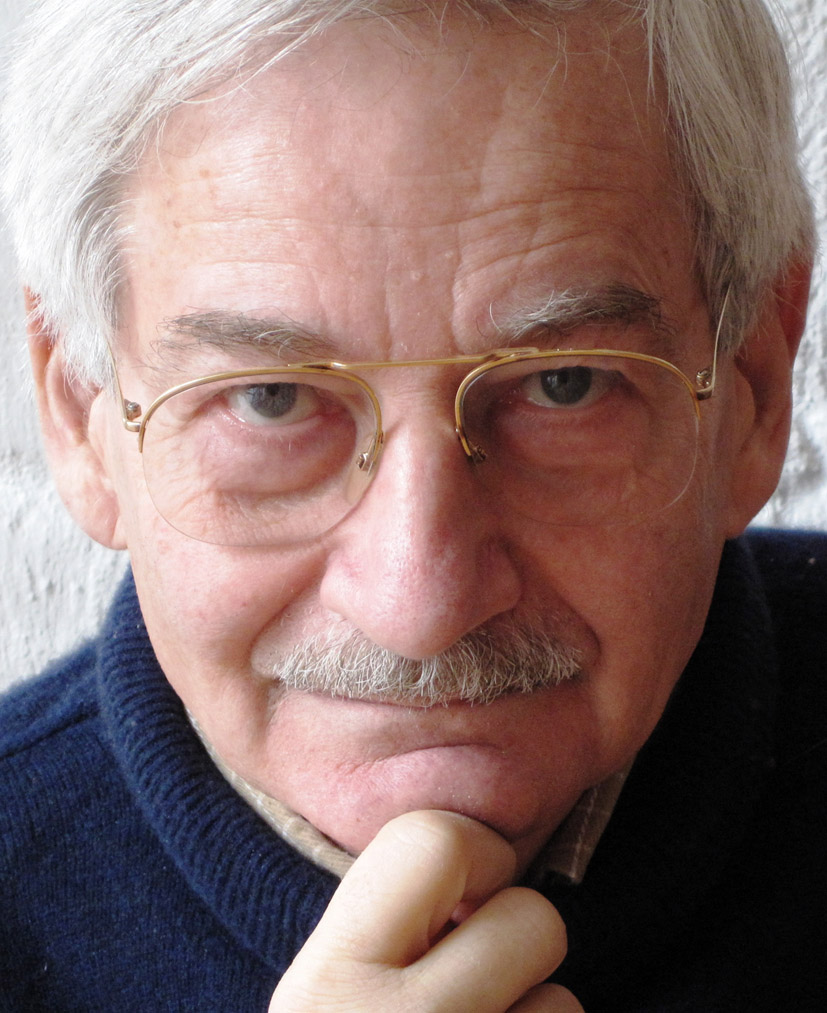
Branko F. M. Bošnjaković

Branko (Franjo Marko) Bošnjaković (born 18 February 1939) is a Dutch-Croatian physicist and professional working in the field of environmental protection and sustainability.

== Biography ==
Branko Bošnjaković was born in Zagreb. He studied physics at the Georg-August University in Göttingen, Germany and obtained his doctorate in nuclear physics at the State University of Utrecht, Netherlands in 1968. His career included basic and applied research, international management and advisory functions.

== Professional activities ==
The years 1968 to 1975 were spent on research in elementary particle physics at CERN, Geneva (Switzerland). From 1975 to 1991, as a senior advisor with the Dutch Ministry of Environment, he conceived and coordinated the multi-annual Dutch National Programme on radiation in the living environment. As a member of the International Non-Ionizing Radiation Committee (INIRC, now ICNIRP) from 1979 to 1992, he contributed to the setting and acceptance of world-wide radiation protection standards. In 1990, he participated in the International Atomic Energy Agency (IAEA) Expert Group planning the Chernobyl Centre for International Research.

From 1991 to 1993, he was a member of the management team of Regional Environmental Center for Central and Eastern Europe (REC) in Budapest, Hungary. Subsequently, he advised the World Health Organization European Centre on Environment and Health, Bilthoven, the Netherlands. In 1994, he became a member of the Commission for Education and Communication of the International Union for Conservation of Nature (IUCN). From 1994 to 2001, as Regional Adviser on Environment of the UN Economic Commission for Europe, he addressed trans-boundary water and environmental issues in Central Asia, Transcaucasia and Southeast Europe. From 1994 to 2009, he was also affiliated to the Avalon Foundation for the promotion of sustainable agriculture in transition countries. In 2001 he was elected as titular professor at the Faculty of Engineering, University of Rijeka, Croatia, focusing on environmental management. He has he acted also as a consultant for the European Commission, Organization for Security and Co-operation in Europe and UNESCO. He has been author or co-author of more than 120 scientific and professional publications in the fields of nuclear physics, elementary particle physics, radiation protection, institutional and geopolitical issues of the environment, natural resources and energy, and of sustainable development. A frequently quoted book is Human Exposure to Ultraviolet Radiation: Risks and Regulations, Editors W. F. Passchier and B. F. M. Bosnjakovic, Excerpta Medica, Amsterdam - New York City - Oxford, 1987.

== Author or co-author of publications (selection) ==
- Nuclear Waste Disposal in Salt: Long Term Environmental Consequences of Disposal in a Salt Dome in The Netherlands, Atomkernenergie-Kerntechnik 38 (1981) 127-133.
- Transfrontier emergency planning within the European Communities, Proceedings of an International Symposium on Emergency Planning and Preparedness for Nuclear Facilities, organised by the IAEA and held in Rome, Italy, 4–8 November 1985 (p. 35-41).
- UN/ECE strategies for protecting the environment with respect to international watercourses: the Helsinki and Espoo Conventions, In: “International watercourses: enhancing cooperation and managing conflict”, edited by Salman M.A. Salman and Laurence Boisson de Chazournes. World Bank Technical Paper No. 414 (p. 47-64), The World Bank, Washington, D.C., 1998.
- Regulations of International Watercourses under the UN/ECE Regional Agreements, Water International, Vol. 25, Number 4, December 2000, p. 544-553.
- UNECE environmental conventions: their role and potential to promote conflict prevention and settlement of disputes in transboundary environmental issues, In E. Petzold-Bradley/A. Carius/A. Vincze (eds.), Responding to Environmental Conflicts: Implications for Theory and Practice, p. 263-282. Kluwer Academic Publisher 2000.
- Valuing and paying for ecosystem services: a pre-condition for sustainability, Ecohydrology & Hydrobiology, Vol. 6, Number 1-4, 2006, p. 123-134.
- Geopolitics of climate change: a review. Thermal Science, Vol. 16, No. 3,2012 (p. 629-654).
- Environment and climate change as geopolitical issues in the Asias: what can be learned from the European experience? Globality Studies Journal, Issue 35, 26 July 2013

== Distinctions ==
Branko Bošnjaković received a plaquette of recognition by the US Environmental Protection Agency (EPA) in 1992, and the golden award for civil protection of the Republic of Slovenia in 1994. He was appointed Honorary Associate by the Centre for Energy, Petroleum and Mineral Law and Policy (CEPMLP) in Dundee, Scotland, in 1998, and a Life Fellow of the REC (Regional Environmental Centre for Central and Eastern Europe), Hungary, 2000. He received the Gouden Tientje (Golden Coin) from the Dutch Ministry of Environment in recognition of achievements for environment and sustainable development.

== Other interests ==
As a coordinator of the Dutch Section of Amnesty International for the human rights in East Germany (former GDR) from 1985 to 1991, Branko Bošnjaković witnessed some of the historic changes on the spot. From 1990 to 1995, he was a member of the Board of the Foundation Netherlands-Croatia. He was co-organiser of a meeting held in Vienna in 2009 under the auspices of the Ignaz Lieben Society on the history of science and technology. In 2011, he was an invited speaker at the Conference on Scholars in Exile and Dictatorships of the 20th Century.

== Private ==
Branko Bošnjaković originates from a scientifically oriented family. His father Fran Bošnjaković (1902–1993) had international reputation in technical thermodynamics, his grandfather Srećko Bošnjaković (1865–1907) was a pioneer of chemistry and sports in Croatia. He is father of a daughter and a son, and grandfather of three grandchildren; his residence is in Switzerland.
