= Branka Bošnjak =

Serbian politician and architect (born 1956)

Branka Bošnjak (Serbian Cyrillic: Бранка Бошњак; born 23 January 1956) is an architect and politician in Serbia. She has served two terms in the National Assembly of Serbia, first as a member of G17 Plus and later with the Social Democratic Party of Serbia (SDPS).

She is not to be confused with a different Branka Bošnjak who has served in the Parliament of Montenegro.

== Early life and career ==
Bošnjak was born in Belgrade, in what was then the People's Republic of Serbia in the Federal People's Republic of Yugoslavia. She graduated from the University of Belgrade Faculty of Architecture with the second-highest average in her cohort and was recognized as a student of the generation. She later worked extensively as a project engineer, both in Yugoslavia and internationally.

== Politician ==
=== G17 Plus ===
Bošnjak joined the G17 Plus network on its formation in 1999 and became a more prominent figure in the organization after it became a political party in 2002.

She received the sixteenth position on the G17 Plus electoral list in the 2003 Serbian parliamentary election and was awarded a mandate the list won thirty-four seats. (From 2000 to 2011, mandates in Serbian parliamentary elections were awarded to sponsoring parties or coalitions rather than individual candidates, and it was common practice for the mandates to be assigned out of numerical order. Bošnjak did not automatically receive a mandate by virtue of her list position, though she was included in her party's delegation all the same when the assembly met in January 2004.) G17 Plus subsequently participated in Serbia's coalition government, and Bošnjak supported the administration in parliament. She served on the committee on relations with Serbs outside Serbia, the committee on transport and communications, and the committee on trade and tourism.

Bošnjak was the G17 Plus candidate for mayor of Belgrade in the 2004 Serbian local elections and finished in seventh place. She also appeared in the fourth position on the party's electoral list for the City Assembly of Belgrade in the same election and was given a mandate when the list won five seats. She later served on the Belgrade city council (i.e., the executive branch of the city government) with responsibility for urban affairs.

She resigned from the national assembly in May 2006, shortly after Miroljub Labus stood down as G17 Plus leader. She was not a candidate for the Belgrade assembly in the 2008 Serbian local elections.

=== Social Democratic Party of Serbia ===
Bošnjak subsequently joined Rasim Ljajić's SDPS. This party contested the 2014 Serbian parliamentary election on the electoral list of the Serbian Progressive Party; Bošnjak received the ninetieth position and was re-elected to the assembly when the list won a landslide victory with 158 out of 250 mandates. (Following a 2011 reform, all mandates were awarded to candidates on successful lists in numerical order.) In her second term, Bošnjak was a member of the committee on the rights of the child and the committee for spatial planning, transport, infrastructure, and telecommunications. She was also the leader of Serbia's parliamentary friendship group with the Holy See and a member of the friendship groups with Argentina, Australia, Belgium, Bosnia and Herzegovina, Brazil, Canada, Croatia, Cuba, Cyprus, France, Germany, Greece, India, Indonesia, Iraq, Israel, Italy, the Republic of Macedonia, Montenegro, Portugal, Slovenia, Spain, Switzerland, the United States of America, and Venezuela, as well as the friendship group with Sub-Saharan Africa and the group with Chile, Colombia, Paraguay, and Uruguay. She was not a candidate for re-election in 2016.

== Electoral ==
=== City of Belgrade ===
2004 City of Belgrade local election Mayor of Belgrade - First and Second Rounds
Nenad Bogdanović	Democratic Party–Boris Tadić	165,565	33.52	234,513	50.91
Aleksandar Vučić	Serbian Radical Party	145,959	29.55	226,161	49.09
Zoran Drakulić	Democratic Party of Serbia–Vojislav Koštunica	75,548	15.29		
Nebojša Čović	Democratic Alternative–Social Democratic Party–Dr. Nebojša Čović	28,631	5.80		
Jasmina Mitrović Marić	Strength of Serbia Movement	27,599	5.59		
Žarko Obradović	Socialist Party of Serbia	19,062	3.86		
Branka Bošnjak	G17 Plus–Miroljub Labus	15,480	3.13		
Dragan Kojadinović	Serbian Renewal Movement–Vuk Drašković	8,823	1.79		
Slobodan Vuksanović	People's Democratic Party	7,318	1.48		
Total valid votes		493,985	100	460,674	100
Sources: Službeni List (Grada Beograda), Volume 48 Number 27 (20 September 2004), p. 2; Službeni List (Grada Beograda), Volume 48 Number 29 (4 October 2004), p. 1.
