= Name of Bosnia =

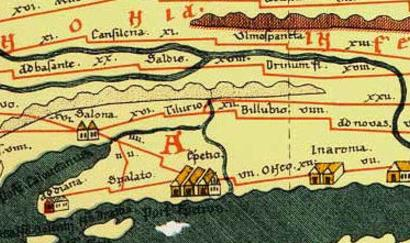
The Roman station Ad Basante from 5th century itinerarium Tabula Peutingeriana.

The name of Bosnia is commonly used in English language as an exonym Bosnia, representing the South Slavic common endonym Bosna (or Босна in Cyrillic script). The name was first recorded during the 10th century, in the Greek form Βόσονα, designating the region. In following centuries, the name was used as a designation for a Bosnian medieval state. After the Ottoman conquest in 1463, the name continued to be used as a designation for the Sanjak and Eyalet of Bosnia. After the Austro-Hungarian occupation in 1878, the region of Bosnia was reorganized and the name of its region of Herzegovina incorporated into the dual name of Bosnia and Herzegovina.

From the name of Bosnia, various local terms (demonyms), depending on era, have been derived designating its population, from endonym Bošnjani during the 14th and 15th century to Bosniak during the Ottoman period, with various Turkish-language variations of the root Bosna were used as demonyms (such as Turkish: Boşnak, Bosnali, Bosnavi). Terms like "Bosniaks" or "Bosniacs" (Bošnjaci) and "Bosnians" (Bosanci) were also used as common demonyms, denoting all Slavic inhabitants of Bosnia, regardless of their religion. By the end of the 20th century, the demonym Bosniak(s) was chosen by the Bosnian Muslims as an ethnonym; they are since known as ethnic Bosniaks.

== Etymology ==
The name of the polity of Bosnia as per traditional view in linguistics originated as a hydronym, the name of the Bosna river, believed to be of pre-Slavic origin.

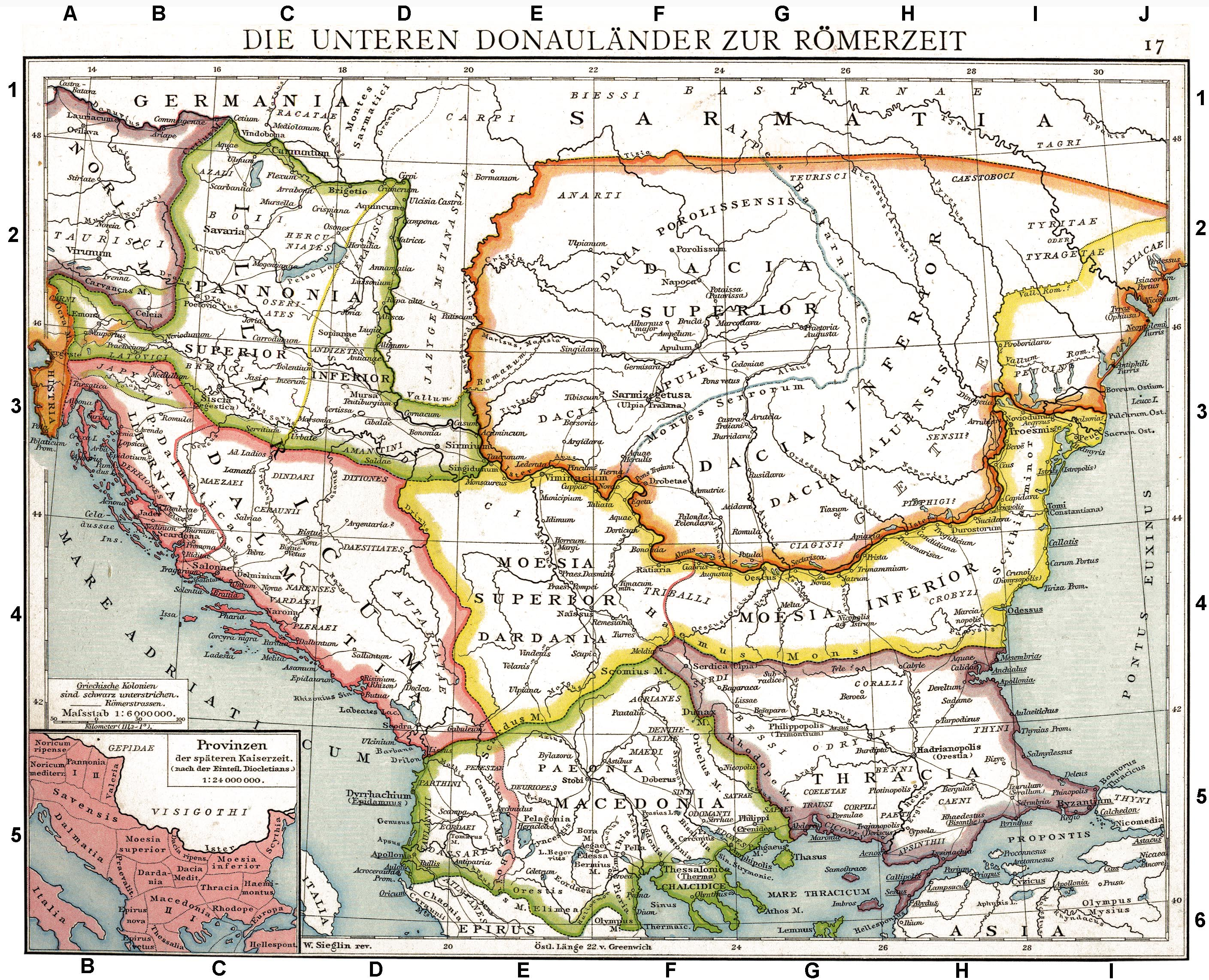
Bosna river marked as Basante on the historical map of the Roman provinces from Gustav Droysens Historical Atlas, 1886.

The river may have been mentioned for the first time in the 1st century AD by Roman historian Marcus Velleius Paterculus under the name Bathinus flumen. Another basic source associated with the hydronym Bathinus is the Salonitan inscription of the governor of Dalmatia, Publius Cornelius Dolabella, where it is stated that the Bathinum river divides the Breuci from the Osseriates. Some scholars also connect the Roman road station Ad Basante, first attested in the 5th century Tabula Peutingeriana, to Bosnia. According to the English medievalist William Miller in the work Essays on the Latin Orient (1921), the Slavic settlers in Bosnia "adapted the Latin designation [...] Basante, to their own idiom by calling the stream Bosna and themselves Bosniaks [...]". According to philologist Anton Mayer the name Bosna could essentially be derived from Illyrian Bass-an-as(-ā) which would be a diversion of the Proto-Indo-European root *bhoĝ-, meaning "the running water". The Croatian linguist, and one of the world's foremost onomastics experts, Petar Skok expressed an opinion that the chronological transformation of this hydronym from the Roman times to its final Slavicization occurred in the following order; *Bassanus> *Bassenus> *Bassinus> *Bosina> Bosьna> Bosna. Other theories involve the rare Latin term Bosina, meaning boundary, and possible Slavic and Thracian origins. Theories that advocates the link of the name Bosnia, and thus of the Bosniaks with the Early Slavs of northern Europe has initially been proposed by the 19th century historians Joachim Lelewel and Johann Kaspar Zeuss, who considered the name of Bosnia to be derived from a Slavic ethnonym, Buzhans (Latin: Busani), mentioned in the Primary Chronicle and by the Geographus Bavarus in his Description of cities and lands north of the Danube. According to both Lelewel and Zeuss Buzhans settled in Bosnia. The theory of Slavic origin of the name Bosnia and its possible connection with the Slavic tribe of Buzhans, came also to be advocated by the 20th and 21st century Yugoslav and Bosnian historians such as Marko Vego, Muhamed Hadžijahić and Mustafa Imamović.

In the Slavic languages, -ak is a common suffix appended to words to create a masculine noun, for instance also found in the ethnonym of Poles (Polak) and Slovaks (Slovák). As such, "Bosniak" is etymologically equivalent to its non-ethnic counterpart "Bosnian" (which entered English around the same time via the Middle French, Bosnien): a native of Bosnia.

== Medieval terms for Bosnia and its population ==
The first mention of a Bosnia is from De Administrando Imperio (DAI; c. 960), which mentions it as χοριον Βοσωνα (horion Bosona, a "small country Bos(o)na").

In following centuries, the name was used as a designation for a medieval polity, called the Banate of Bosnia and transformed by 1377 into the Kingdom of Bosnia. After the Ottoman conquest in 1463, the name was adopted and used as a designation for the Sanjak of Bosnia

From the name of Bosnia and depending on era, various local demonyms have been derived designating its population. The South Slavic endonym Bošnjani (Latin: Bosniensis, Serbo-Croatian: Bošnjani or Бошњани in Cyrillic script), referring to Bosnia inhabitants, was used during the 14th and 15th century in order to denote local population of the Banate of Bosnia and later the Kingdom of Bosnia., which can be attested in various charters of the 14th and 15th centuries during the reign of ban Stjepan II Kotromanić, ban and king Tvrtko I Kotromanić, King Stjepan Ostoja, and charters of their nobility. Usually in these charters, Bosnian rulers and lords mention Bošnjani as witnesses. By the 15th century, the suffix -(n)in had been replaced by -ak to create the form Bošnjak (Bosniak). Bosnian king Tvrtko II in his 1440 delegation to Polish king of Hungary, Władysław Warneńczyk (r. 1440–44), asserted that the ancestors of the Bosnians and Poles were the same, and that they speak the same language.

== Terminology from the Ottoman period ==
After the Ottoman conquest in 1463, the name was adopted and used during the Ottoman rule as a designation for the Sanjak of Bosnia and Eyalet of Bosnia.

During this period, demonym Bosniak was established for the population, with various Turkish-language variations of the root Bosna such as Turkish: Boşnak, Bosnali, Bosnavi, Bosnevi, Boşnaklar, Bosnalilar, taife-i Boşnakiyan, Boşnak taifesi, Bosna takimi, Boşnak milleti, Bosnali or Boşnak kavmi, while their language was called Boşnakça. Endonym variations for Bosniaks or Bosniacs (Bošnjaci) and Bosnians (Bosanci) were also used as common demonyms, denoting all Slavic inhabitants of Bosnia, regardless of their religion.

The 17th-century Ottoman traveler and writer Evliya Çelebi reports in his work Seyahatname of the people in Bosnia as natively known as Bosnians. However, the concept of nationhood was foreign to the Ottomans at that time – not to mention the idea that Muslims and Christians of some military province could foster any common supra-confessional sense of identity. Nevertheless, the inhabitants of Bosnia used the same common name, calling themselves from Bosnian, in the full spectrum of the word's meaning with a foundation as a territorial designation, while also using a series of regional and confessional names, all the way to modern-day national ones. In this regard, Christian Bosnians had not described themselves as either Serbs or Croats prior to the early 19th century in case of Serbs, and early 20th century in case of Croats according to researchers Robert J. Donia, John V. A. Fine, Dubravko Lovrenović.

During the 19th century, many prominent Catholics were staunch proponent of Bosniak national identity, particularly among Bosnian Franciscans, most notable of whom were Fra Matija Divković Ivan Frano Jukić, Antun Knežević, Marijan Šunjić, Martin Nedić, Jako Baltić, Blaž Josić and fra Grgo Martić while being an active member of the Illyrian Movement.

== "Bosniaks" as a demonym in Early modern Western use ==
According to the Bosniak entry in the Oxford English Dictionary, the first preserved use of "Bosniak" in English was by British diplomat and historian Paul Rycaut in 1680 as Bosnack, cognate with post-classical Latin Bosniacus (1682 or earlier), French Bosniaque (1695 or earlier) or German Bosniak (1737 or earlier). The modern spelling is contained in the 1836 Penny Cyclopaedia V. 231/1: "The inhabitants of Bosnia are composed of Bosniaks, a race of Sclavonian origin".

== Bosniak ethnonym ==
During Yugoslavia, the term "Muslims" (Serbo-Croatian: muslimani) was used for Bosnia and Herzegovina's Muslim population. By the end of the 20th century, the demonym Bosniak(s) was chosen by the Bosnian Muslims, and in 27 and 28 September 1993 adopted as an ethnonym at the Prvi sabor Vijeća Kongresa bosansko-muslimanskih intelektualaca (transl. First assembly of the Council of the Congress of Bosnian-Muslim Intellectuals) in Sarajevo, henceforth named Vijeće Kongresa bošnjačkih intelektualaca (transl. First assembly of the Council of the Congress of Bosniak Intellectuals); they are since known as ethnic Bosniaks.

== Sources ==
- Donia, Robert J.; Fine, John Van Antwerp Jr. (1994). Bosnia and Hercegovina: A Tradition Betrayed. C. Hurst & Co. Publishers. ISBN 978-1-85065-212-0.
- Hadžijahić, Muhamed (1990) [1974]. Od tradicije do identiteta: geneza nacionalnog pitanja bosanskih Muslimana. Islamska zajednica.
- Kaimakamova, Miliana; Salamon, Maciej (2007). Byzantium, new peoples, new powers: the Byzantino-Slav contact zone, from the ninth to the fifteenth century. Towarzystwo Wydawnicze "Historia Iagellonica". ISBN 978-83-88737-83-1.
- Moravcsik, Gyula, ed. (1967) [1949]. Constantine Porphyrogenitus: De Administrando Imperio (2nd revised ed.). Washington D.C.: Dumbarton Oaks Center for Byzantine Studies. ISBN 9780884020219.
- Motyl, Alexander J. (2001). Encyclopedia of Nationalism, Volume II. Academic Press. pp. 56–57. ISBN 0-12-227230-7.
