= Bošnjani =

Archaic name for inhabitants of Bosnia

Bošnjani (Cyrillic: Бошњани; singular masculine: Bošnjanin / Бошњанин, feminine: Bošnjanka / Бошњанка; Latin: Bosniensis), meaning Bosnians, is the name originating from the Middle Ages, used for the inhabitants of Bosnia. The name is used and can be found in Bosnian written monuments from that period, appearing in Venetian sources as earliest as 12th century, according to investigation of the relations between Bosnia and Venetia by historian Marko Šunjić, and other documents until at least early 16th century and the Ottoman conquest and power stabilization.

The term good Bosnian (dobri Bošnjanin, добри Бошњанин) was not a geographical reference for the inhabitants along the Bosna River, but it was referred to the population of the entire medieval Bosnia, regardless of religion, which can be seen in various charters of the 14th and 15th centuries during the reign of ban Stjepan II Kotromanić, ban Tvrtko I Kotromanić, King Stjepan Ostoja, etc. In these charters, Bosnian rulers mention good Bosnians as witnesses.

== History ==
The demonym "Bošnjani" appears in medieval state documents (charters) of foreign and/or Bosnian provenience, written in Bosnian Cyrillic, since the 12th century, and is used in reference to Bosnian nobility of medieval Bosnia, their subjects, to the witnesses in disputes, testaments, provisions, to their relatives and kin, and so on. Most notably it was used in charters by Bosnian magnates and royalties, and among the last to use it in his being Bosnian king Stjepan Tomašević, prior to the Ottoman conquest of Bosnia.

Appearing in a number of documents from the period, it was often coupled with the word "Good" (Dobri, Добри). For example, a 1417 document by Stjepan Ostoja mentions i nostri boni Bosnensi, and the same term is used in a 1419 document by Stjepan Ostojić. Ćošković dates the term to Stjepan II Kotromanić (1322–53). The syntagm of Dobri Bošnjani, Добри Бошњани (the "Good Bosnians") which appear in historical documents (charters) as a social and ethical category, historian Srečko Džaja relates to similar syntagm of "boni homines".

=== Examples ===
After a plot to assassinate Knez Pavle Radinović in Sutjeska successfully played out during the King Ostoja's 2nd reign in August 1415, Duke Sandalj justified the murder to an astonished witness, Ivan Gundulić, Ragusan diplomatic representative who was attending a meeting of Bosnian noblemen at the stanak and is the best source for the circumstances surrounding the event, by saying:

Bosnian: “Jesi li očekivao da ćeš ovo vidjeti? Tako mi Božijom milošću činimo pravdu kao i vaša gospoda dubrovačka, jer je u Dubrovniku kazna za izdaju odsijecanje glave, pa tako i ja činim s drugim vjernim Bošnjanima”.

"Did you expect to see this? This is how we, by the grace of God, do justice just like your lordship in Dubrovnik, because in Dubrovnik the punishment for treason is beheading, so I do the same with other faithful Bosnians." — excerpt from Ivan Gundulić's letter written to his superiors in Dubrovnik

== Assessment ==
Bosnian historian Pejo Ćošković, citing Ferdo Šišić and Dominik Mandić, describes the use of the term in royal documents as membership in Bosnian nobility, with no indication of the subject's religion. and as a political term to distinguish people from Bosnia proper from people from other lands acquired in the hidays of Kingdom of Bosnia and included into royal titulage.

== Revival ==
During the Austro-Hungarian era the term Bošnjak was also preferred until the beginning of the 20th century, and is encountered in Bosnian Franciscan writings, such as prominent members of the order, historians and writers, Ivan Frano Jukić and Antun Knežević, who were first to relate the name to ethnic and national context. The situation changed again in the 20th century, as Bosanac (see also: Bosnian and Bosnians) came to be the preferred term. Following the independence of Bosnia and Herzegovina in the early 1990s, Bosniaks reinvigorated the (by then) archaic term Bošnjaci – Bosniaks – for their national name, based on the word's historical ethno-geographic connotations.

== See also ==
- Bosnia and Herzegovina in the Middle Ages
- Ethnic groups in Bosnia and Herzegovina

== Bibliography ==
- Filipović, Emir O. (2019). Bosansko kraljevstvo i Osmansko carstvo: (1386-1463) (in Bosnian). Orijentalni institut Univerziteta u Sarajevu. ISBN 978-9958-626-47-0.
- Živković, Pavo (1981). Tvrtko II Tvrtković: Bosna u prvoj polovini xv stoljeća (in Serbo-Croatian). Sarajevo: Institut za istoriju. ISBN 0-472-08260-4.
