= Bosnia (disambiguation) =

Bosnia primarily refers to Bosnia and Herzegovina, a country in southeastern Europe.

Bosnia may also refer to:

- Bosnia (region), a region in southeastern Europe
- Administrative entities in the history of Bosnia and Herzegovina
  - Banate of Bosnia, autonomous part of the Kingdom of Hungary
  - Kingdom of Bosnia, a medieval kingdom
  - Bosnia Sanjak, a province of the Ottoman Empire
  - Bosnia Eyalet, a province of the Ottoman Empire
  - Bosnia Vilayet, a province of the Ottoman Empire
- Bosnia (album), an album by Grand Funk Railroad
- "Bosnia", a song by the Cranberries from To the Faithful Departed

== See also ==
- Bosna (disambiguation)
- Bosnian (disambiguation)
