= Salona =

Roman ruined city in Dalmatia

- Σάλωνα (Ancient Greek); Salo (Latin)
- Salon
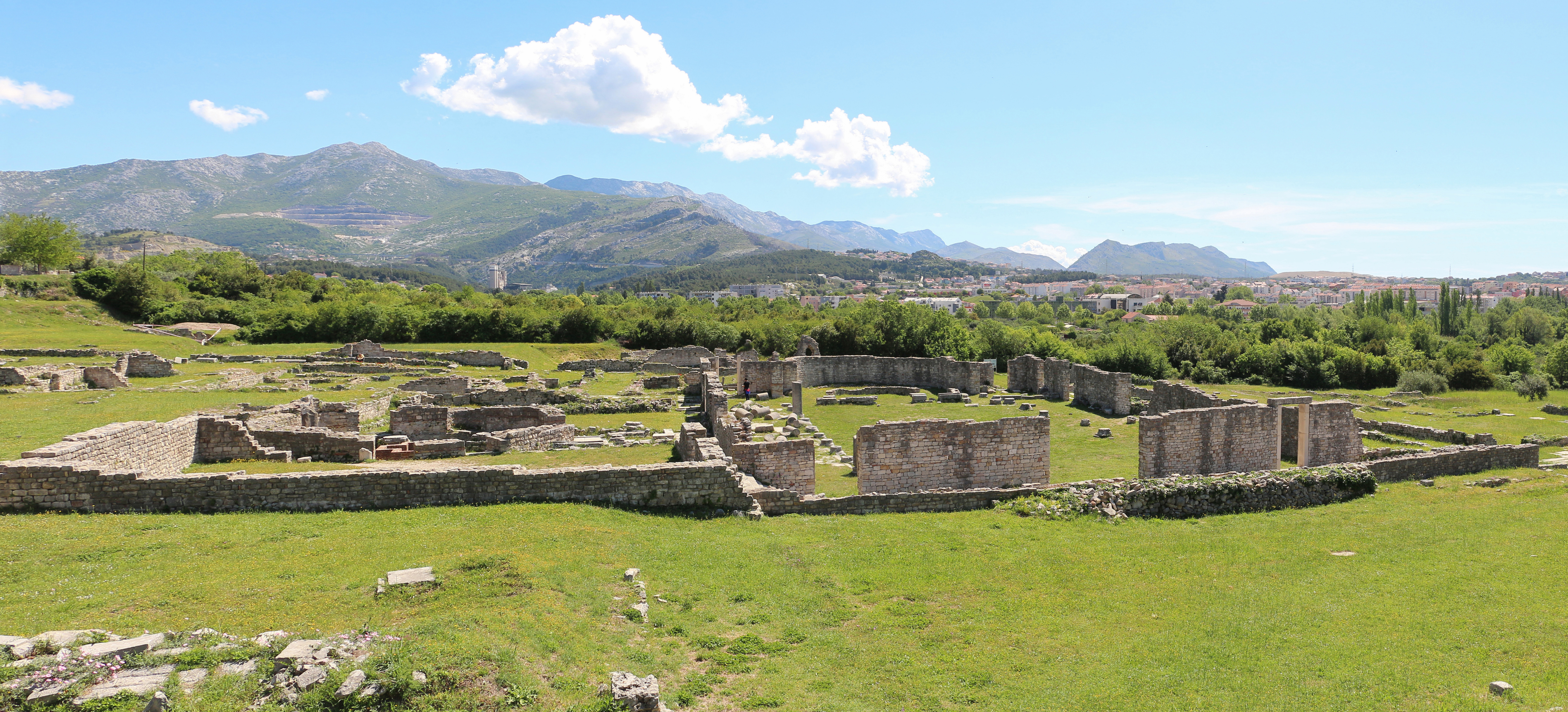
- Episcopal Center

- Location within Croatia
- Interactive map of Salona
- 43°32′22″N 16°28′59″E
- Type: Capital of Dalmatia
- Cultures: Illyrian, Greek, Roman
- Location: Near Solin, Croatia
- Region: Dalmatia

History
- Abandoned: seventh century

Site notes
- Archaeologists: Frane Bulić
- Condition: In ruins

Salona (Ancient Greek: Σάλωνα, Latin: Salo) was an ancient city and the capital of the Roman province of Dalmatia near Split, in Croatia. It was one of the largest cities of the late Roman Empire with approximately 60,000 inhabitants. It was the last residence of the final Western Roman Emperor Julius Nepos and acted as the de facto capital of the Western Roman Empire during the years 476–480. Salona was founded in the third century BC and was mostly destroyed during the invasions of the Avars and Slavs in the seventh century AD. Despite this, there remains many Roman characteristics, including walls, a forum, a theatre, an amphitheatre, public baths and an aqueduct.

== Location ==
Salona was founded on a sheltered inlet on the Adriatic coast. The ruins of Salona are located in the modern town of Solin, around 6 kilometres (3.7 mi) from the major city of Split, in Croatia. The terrain around Salona slopes gently seaward and is typical karst, consisting of low limestone ridges running east to west with marl in the clefts in between them.

== History ==
Salona grew in the area of the Greek cities of Tragurium and Epetium on the Jadro River in the third century BC. It was the birthplace of Roman Emperor Diocletian. In the first millennium BC, the Greeks set up a marketplace. Salona had also been in the territory of the Illyrian Delmatae, before the conquest of the Romans. Salona became the capital of the Roman province of Dalmatia, because it sided with the future Roman dictator Gaius Julius Caesar in the civil war against Pompey. Martia Iulia Valeria Salona Felix (the full name of the ancient city) was founded probably after the Roman civil wars under Julius Caesar. The early Roman city encompassed the area around the Forum and Theatre, with an entrance, the Porta Caesarea, on the north-east side. The walls were fortified with towers during the reign of Augustus. The early trapezoidal shape of the city was transformed by the eastern and western expansion of the city.

The city quickly acquired Roman characteristics: walls, a forum, a theatre, an amphitheatre (which are the most conspicuous above-ground remains today), public baths, and an aqueduct. Many inscriptions in both Latin and Greek have been found inside the walls and in the cemeteries outside, since Romans forbade burials inside the city boundaries. Several fine marble sarcophagi from those cemeteries are now in the Archaeological Museum of Split. All this archaeological evidence attests to the city's prosperity and integration into the Roman Empire. Salona had a mint that was connected with the mint in Sirmium and gold and silver mines in the Dinaric Alps through Via Argentaria.

When the Roman Emperor Diocletian retired, he erected a monumental villa (palace) in a suburban location (6 km away). This massive structure, known as Diocletian's Palace, became the core of the city of Split (Spalatum) after the fall of Salona. Diocletian's tomb was also reportedly located somewhere near Salona.

Salona's continuing prosperity resulted in the extensive building of churches in the fourth and fifth centuries, including an episcopal basilica and a neighboring church and baptistery inside the walls, and several shrines honoring martyrs outside. These remains have made Salona a major site for studying the development of Christian sacred architecture. The Salonitan bishop held the position of metropolitan bishop of Dalmatia. After the fall, the bishopric and other remains were transferred to Split (see Archbishopric of Spalathon). The borders and influence of the Salonitan Archdiocese included almost all of today's Croatia and Bosnia and Herzegovina south of the river Sava and west of the river Drina.

Salona was the only Eastern Adriatic port-city listed in Diocletian's Edict on Maximum Prices, and out of all listed port-cities it had the most maritime connections (those being with Alexandria, Ephesus, Nikomedia, Seleucia Pieria, and Carthago). The connection with Ravenna was also prominent. The connections were not only about the exchange of goods and monuments; prominent individuals also traveled, remained to live and die at Salona (especially from Syria). Salona played a key role in the Gothic War (535–554) and it was besieged by the Ostrogoths. Seemingly it was a big port as for the Battle of Sena Gallica (551), Byzantine general John sailed from it with 38 ships (compared to Ravenna's 12).

Salona is the largest archaeological park in Croatia. According to Constantine VII's De Administrando Imperio (tenth century), Salona was "half the size of Constantinople". Although earlier estimates placed its population at approximately 60,000, recent archaeological excavations suggest the city may have housed at least 80,000 inhabitants.

=== Fall ===
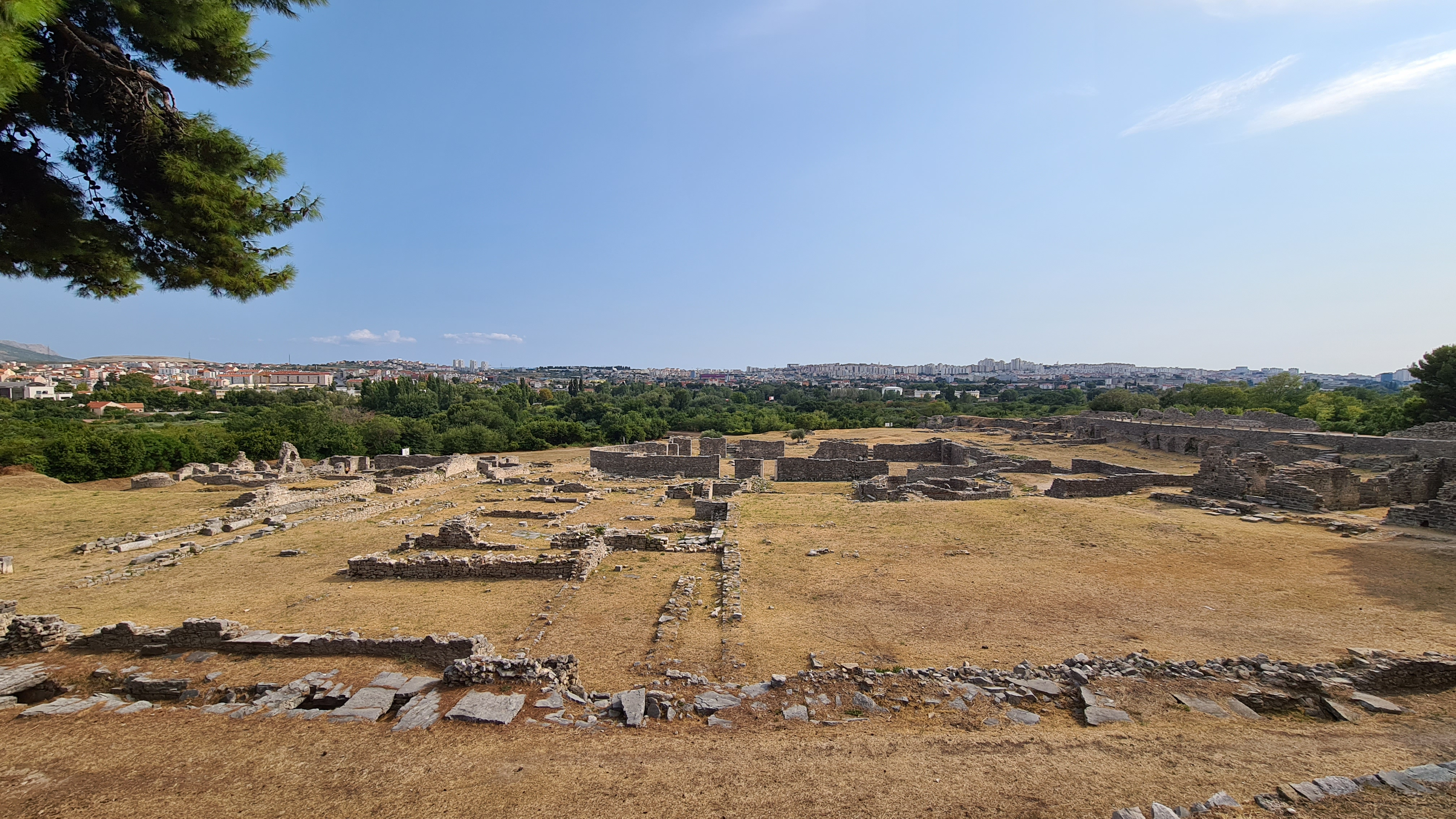
Part of the Salona ruins.

In the early seventh century the Roman limes on the river Danube and Sava fell and was militarily abandoned, leaving the Roman province of Dalmatia open for conquest. The events of the fall of the city due to its location are relevant to the understanding when the province and coastal cities periphery succumbed to barbaric invasion. Pope Gregory I in July 600 wrote to the archbishop of Salona, Maximus, in which he expressed concern about the arrival of the Slavs ("de Sclavorum gente quae vobis valde imminet et affligor vehementer et conturbor"). According to De Administrando Imperio (tenth century) and Thomas the Archdeacon's Historia Salonitana (thirteenth century), Salona was largely destroyed in the seventh century invasions by the Avars and Slavs (more specifically the Croats per Thomas the Archdeacon who also identified them with Goths and Slavs). The city was reportedly conquered by trickery when the Avar-Slavs, having previously defeated a Roman army dispatched from Salona/Klis at the river Danube or Sava (possibly also near Cetina), passed the frontier castrum of Klis in disguise and expelled the Romans from the city. When it became their possession, they "settled and thereafter began gradually to make plundering raids and destroyed the Romans who dwelt in the plains and on the higher ground and took possession of their lands". Refugees from Salona settled in other coastal and island cities (Decatera, Ragusa, Spalato, Tetrangourin, Diadora, Arbe, Vekla and Opara) and inside Diocletian's Palace.

The exact date of destruction and fall is uncertain. Pope John IV sent abbot Martin (possibly future Pope Martin I) to Dalmatia in 641 to redeem captives, which was interpreted that Salona must have been destroyed before that date. As Salona's refugees are also said by Thomas the Archdeacon to have founded Ragusa around 625 it meant that Salona had to be destroyed around 625 or before. In the scholarship, it was traditionally dated to 614, although opinions varied between 608 and 639. The last dated inscription, reflecting existence of life in the city, in the ruins is dated to 12 May 612. However, 1970s were found many coins, out of which few were of Heraclius and youngest minted in 630/631. It is interpreted as evidence that the city was rather becoming steadily abandoned after 614 and probably destroyed in 639. Some other archaeological excavations probably show a small group of people continued to live with newcomers until the mid-seventh century when it became abandoned. Tibor Živković argued that the attack happened in the early 630s and became abandoned after that time.

The new Slavic population settled outside the ruins to the east near the river Jadro, where Old-Croat graves can be found. In the tenth and eleventh centuries, Croatian kings founded and rebuilt three churches in the area, of which of St. Stephen was used as a royal mausoleum for Croatian Kings (with a found sarcophagus of Queen Helen of Zadar), while the Basilica of St. Peter and Moses (now called the Hollow Church) served as the coronation site for King Demetrius Zvonimir in 1075. The archaeologically confirmed information is found in the Historia Salonitana.

== Architecture ==
=== Manastirine ===
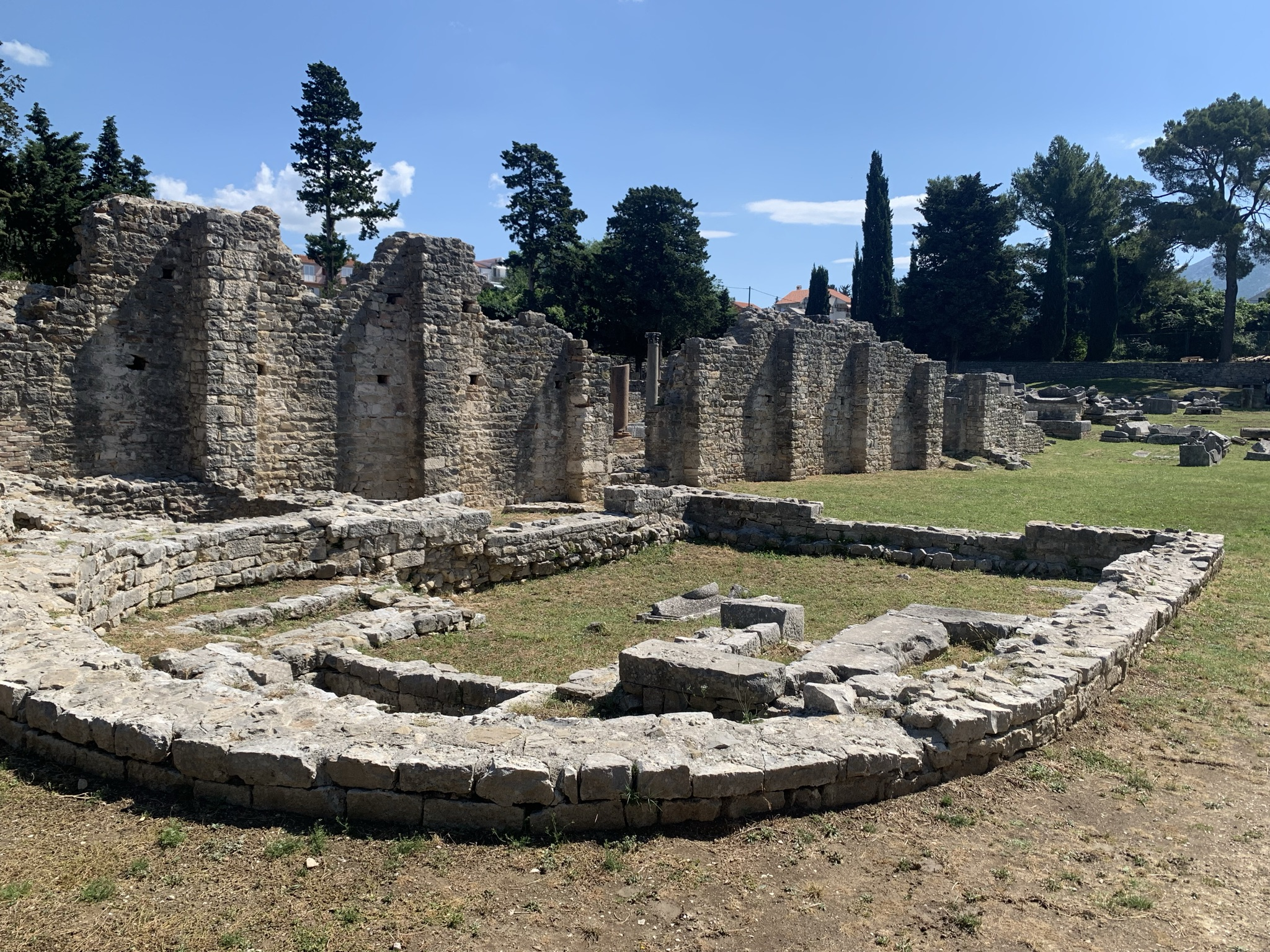
Remnants of the Basilica and cemetery outside of the town

The Manastirine are the remnants of a basilica and cemetery outside of the town. The earliest parts of the complex date back to the second century BC. The bishop and martyr Saint Domnius was buried here after being executed in the amphitheater in 304 AD.

At the end of the fourth century, the complex was partly destroyed during the German incursions, and in the mid-fifth century, a three-nave basilica was constructed on top of the ruins. Many sarcophagi can be found here. In the early seventh century, the cemetery was looted and partly destroyed.

The cemetery exhibits a feature of Christian cemeteries at that time to have deceased buried as close as possible to the martyr or Ad sanctos.

=== Tusculum ===
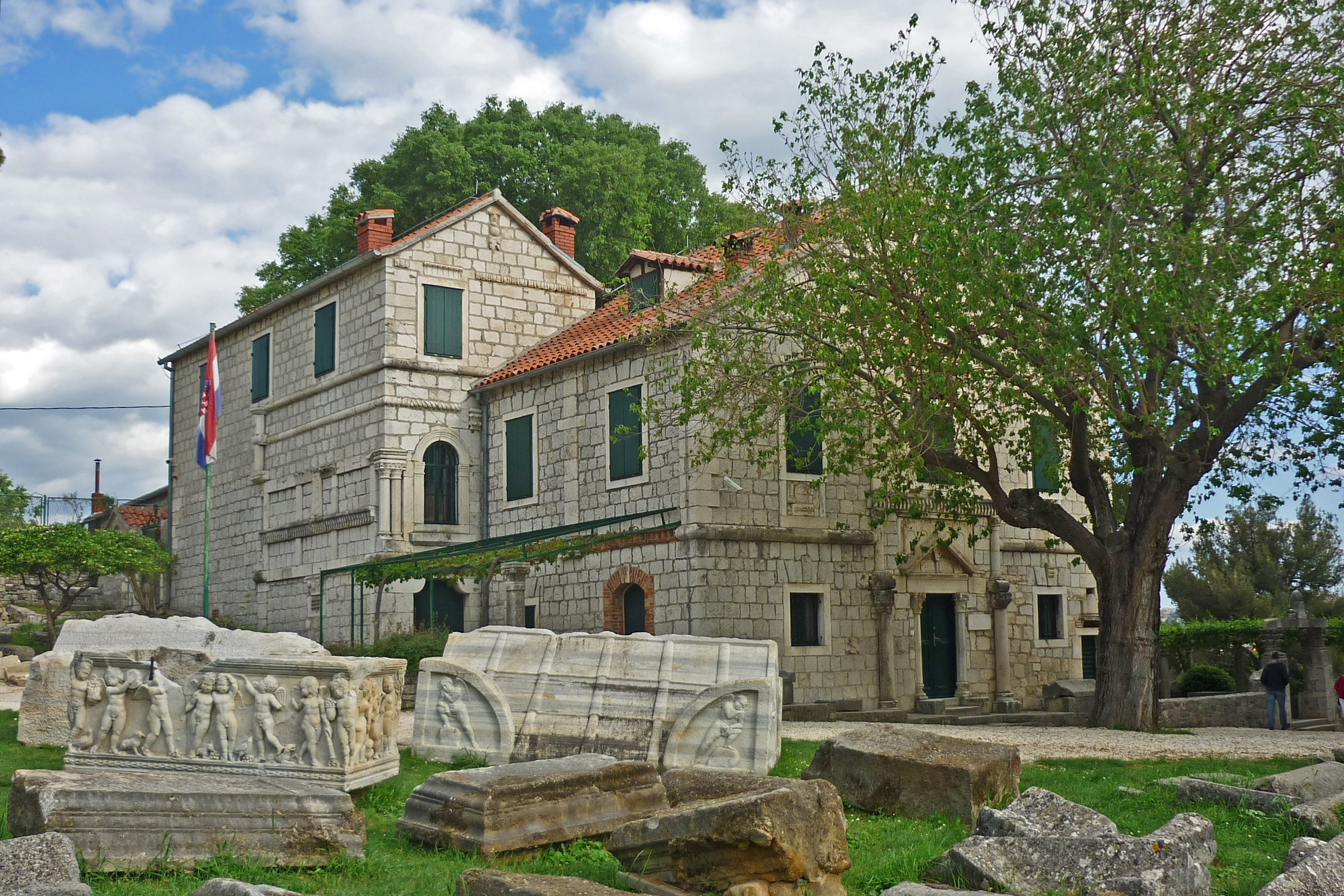
Tusculum

Architectural and ornamental fragments, the inscriptions of capitals, and columns from the area were replaced by a building built in 1898. It was restored in 2008.

=== City walls ===
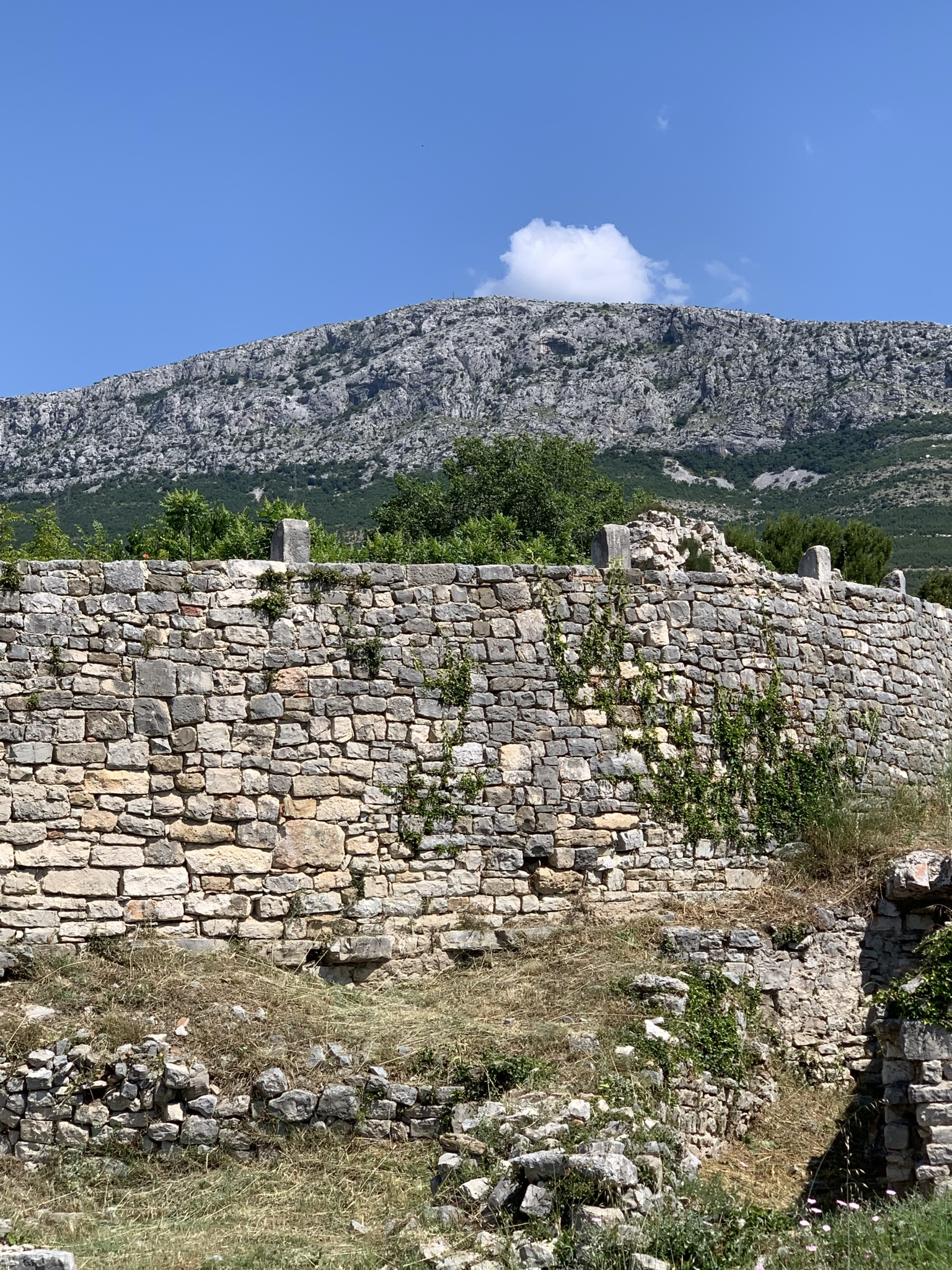
City wall

The construction of the Salonitan city walls took several centuries. The earliest part of the city was surrounded by walls as early as the second century BC. During the Pax Romana the city expanded to both east and west.

During the reign of Emperor Marcus Aurelius around 170 A.D., under the constant threat of Germanic tribes, the east and west suburbs were included in the walls, which were fortified with at least 90 towers. Some parts of existing buildings were used in the extensions to the walls, thus making them integral. The total circumference of the elliptical shape of the walls was approximately 4 km (2.5 mi), with varying width from enclosing 240 acres 1.9 to 2.5 meters (6.2 to 8.2 ft).

During the reign of Emperor Theodosius II in the early fifth century, all the towers were reconstructed, as witnessed by an inscription on the walls. Furthermore, in the first half of the sixth century, triangular-shaped endings were added to some square-shaped towers to improve the city's security and defense system. Such examples are visible today on the northern side of the Urbs orientalis.

=== Episcopal center ===
The center of Christian Salona is in the northwest part of the eastern city. Here is an Episcopal center with twin lengthways basilicas, a baptistery, and Bishop's Palace were built in the fifth century A.D.

This basilica is the largest in the entire area of Dalmatia. The best-preserved part of the oldest part of the city (Urbs vetus) is the eastern wall and Porta Caesarea with two octagonal towers and three passages; one for cart traffic and two for pedestrians on each side of the wider passage. The central passage was probably equipped with a movable grid, as indicated by grooves on side pylons.

=== Aqueduct ===
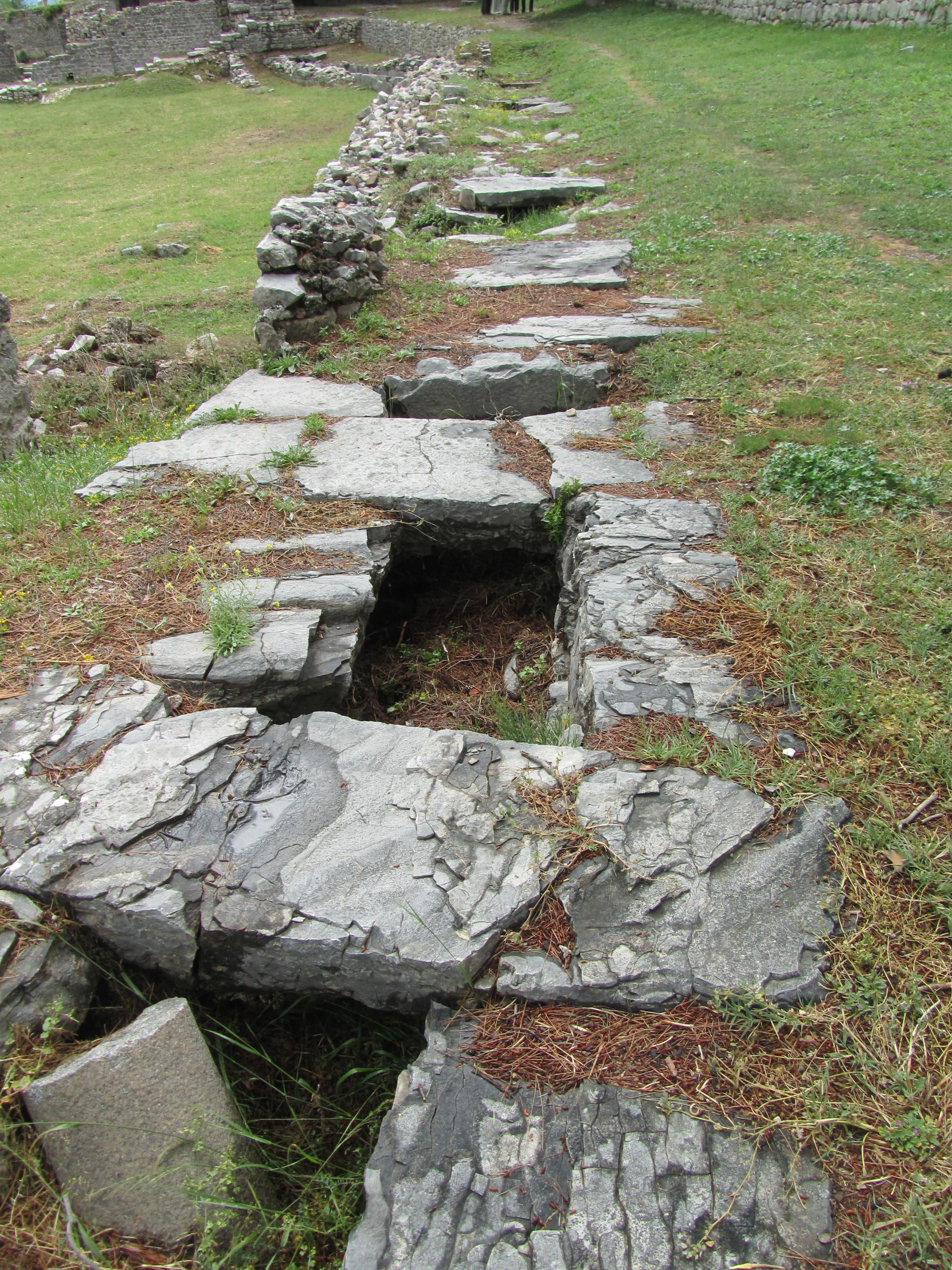
Aqueduct of Salona

Emperor Augustus built an aqueduct to supply the city with water from the river Jadro. It was 3,850 meters (12,630 ft) in length, and the best-preserved part is north of the episcopal center. Calculations show that the aqueduct could supply enough water for about 40,000 people.

=== Thermae ===
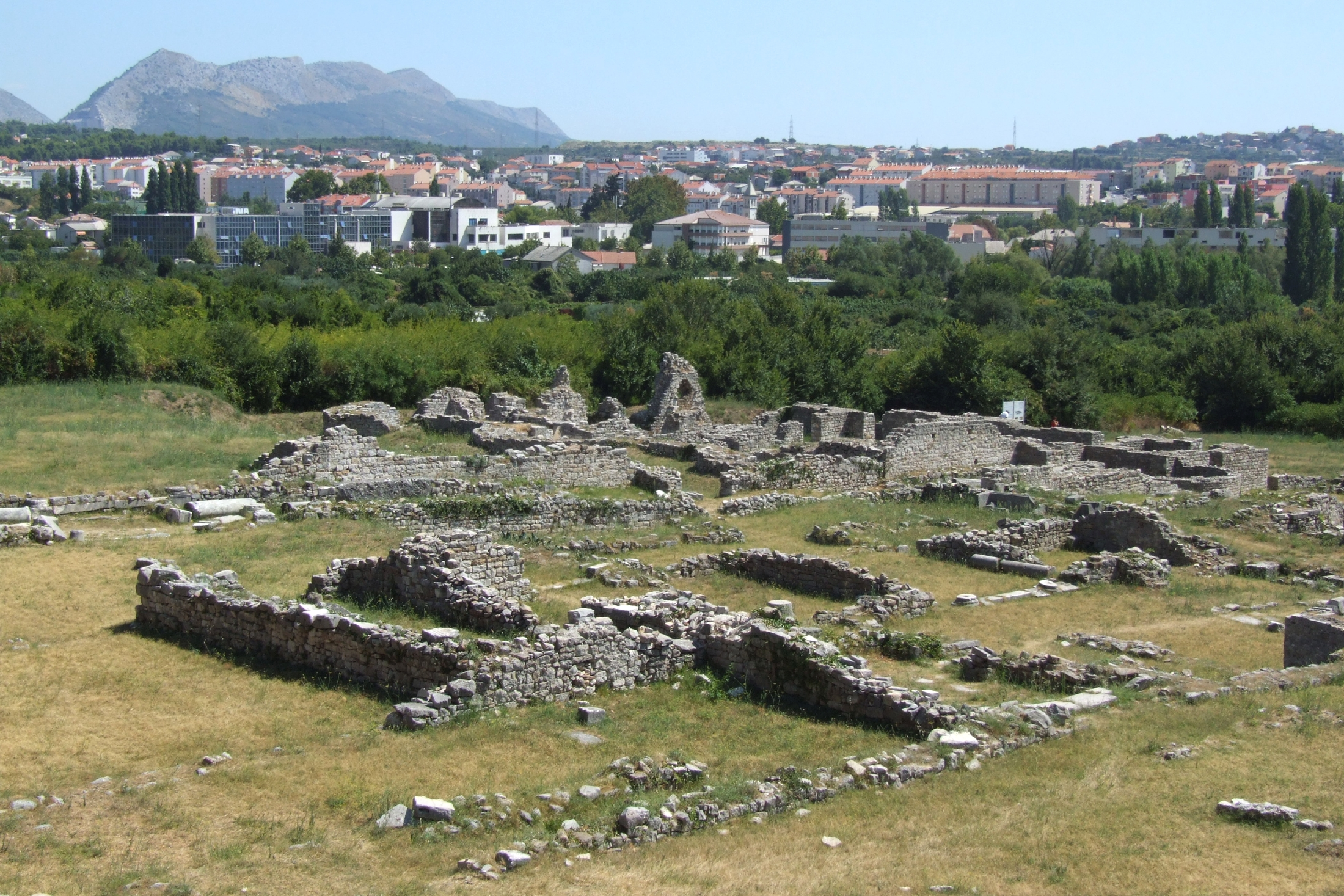
Thermae

The thermae was a type of public bathhouse that was common in Roman civilization and an indispensable part of urban life. Although the city of Salona had multiple baths, the best-preserved and largest ones are those in the eastern part of the city called the Great Thermae, built in the second or beginning of the third century A.D. This building is rectangular in shape, with three symmetrically arranged apses in the north and one in the west. There was an adjoining elongated spacious room to the north, housing a semicircular pool, the piscina, filled with cold water, known as the frigidarium. There were two dressing rooms to the left, with benches for sitting and openings in the wall for clothes. The room to the west was also used as a massage room, the unctorium. The room ending with an apse served both as a lounge and an exercise room. To the right there were hot baths and sauna: caldarium, tepidarium and sudatorium.

=== Bridge of Five Arches ===
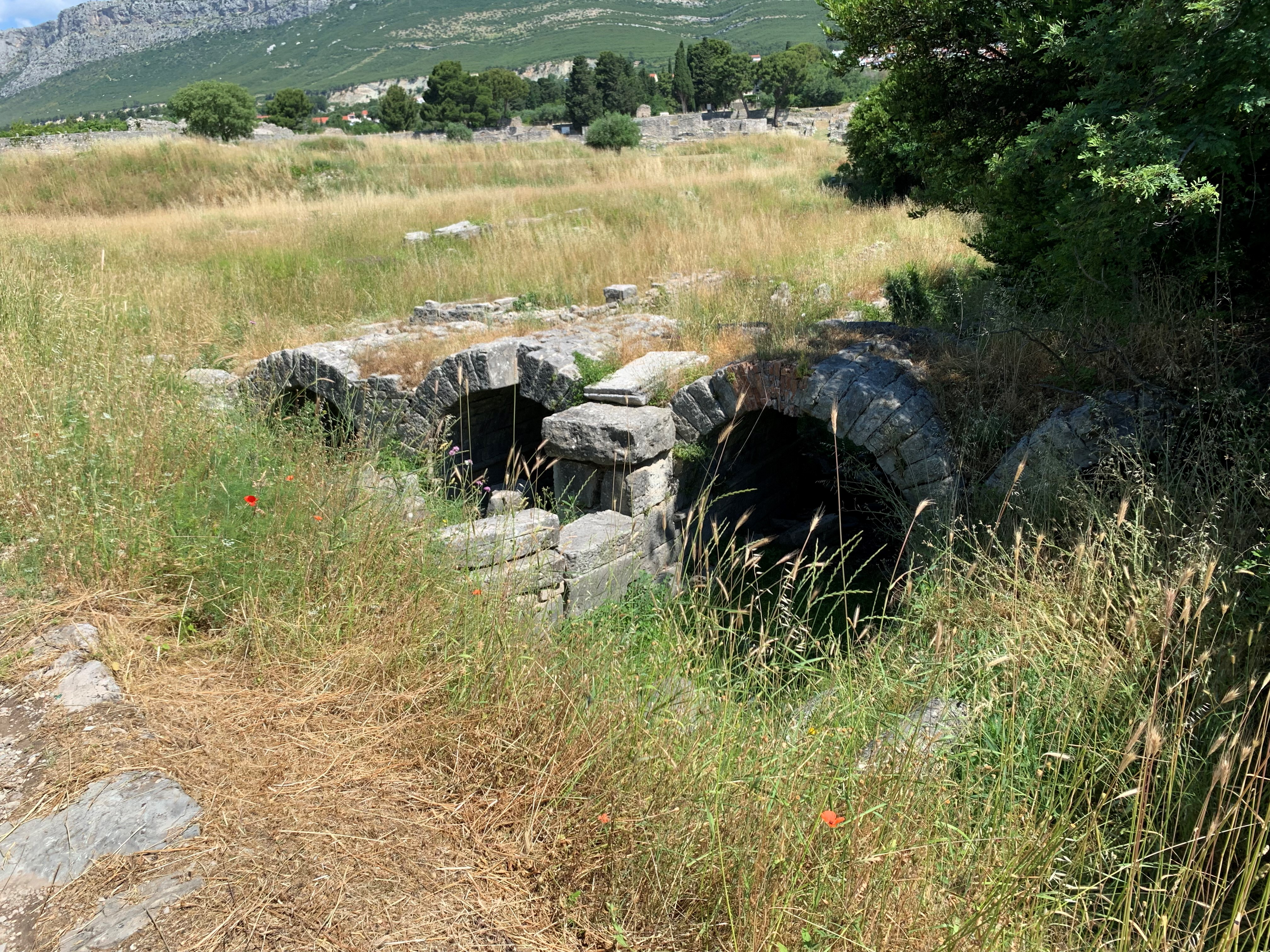
Five Arches Bridge

In the eastern suburb of Salona, five arches spanned the westernmost backwater of the river Jadro. The bridge carried one extension of Decumanus Maximus which branched into two roads, one of which led north-east to the Porta Andetria gate, while the other one led across the bridge to Epetium, today's city of Stobreč.

=== Porta Caesarea ===
The Porta Caesarea is a well-preserved gate with two octagonal towers and three passages, one for cart traffic and two for pedestrians on each side of the wider passage. The central passage was probably equipped with a movable grid, as indicated by grooves on side pylons. Porta Caesarea was constructed using large regular stones primarily for fortification purposes. After eastern and western expansion had occurred, the gate lost its primary purpose and became the carrying construction of the aqueduct. According to Kähler's reconstruction, the gate had two floors, of which the top one was very elaborately decorated with half columns, composite capitals, and window openings. Within the gate, there was a small courtyard for defense purposes.

=== Praetorium ===
Southeast of the Porta Caesarea, a luxurious villa has been uncovered, which was probably the palace of the Roman governor of Dalmatia. Several mosaics depicting mythological figures such as Apollo Orpheus and Triton have been transferred to the archaeological museum in Split.

=== Forum ===
The center of the town's public life was in the southeast part of the old town. It is 45 m × 70 m [ 148 ft × 230 ft ] in size. After the fourth century A.D., as the town became more Christian, the forum started to lose its role as the city center.

=== Theatre ===
A theater 65m * 58m in size was built in the first century A.D.

=== Temple ===
South of the theater, there is a temple that was dedicated to either Dionysus or Liber.

=== Kapljuc ===
These ruins are the remnants of the oldest cemetery basilica. It was built in the middle of the fourth century above the graves of four Praetorian guards who were executed in the arena during Diocletian's persecution of Christians.

=== Amphitheatre ===
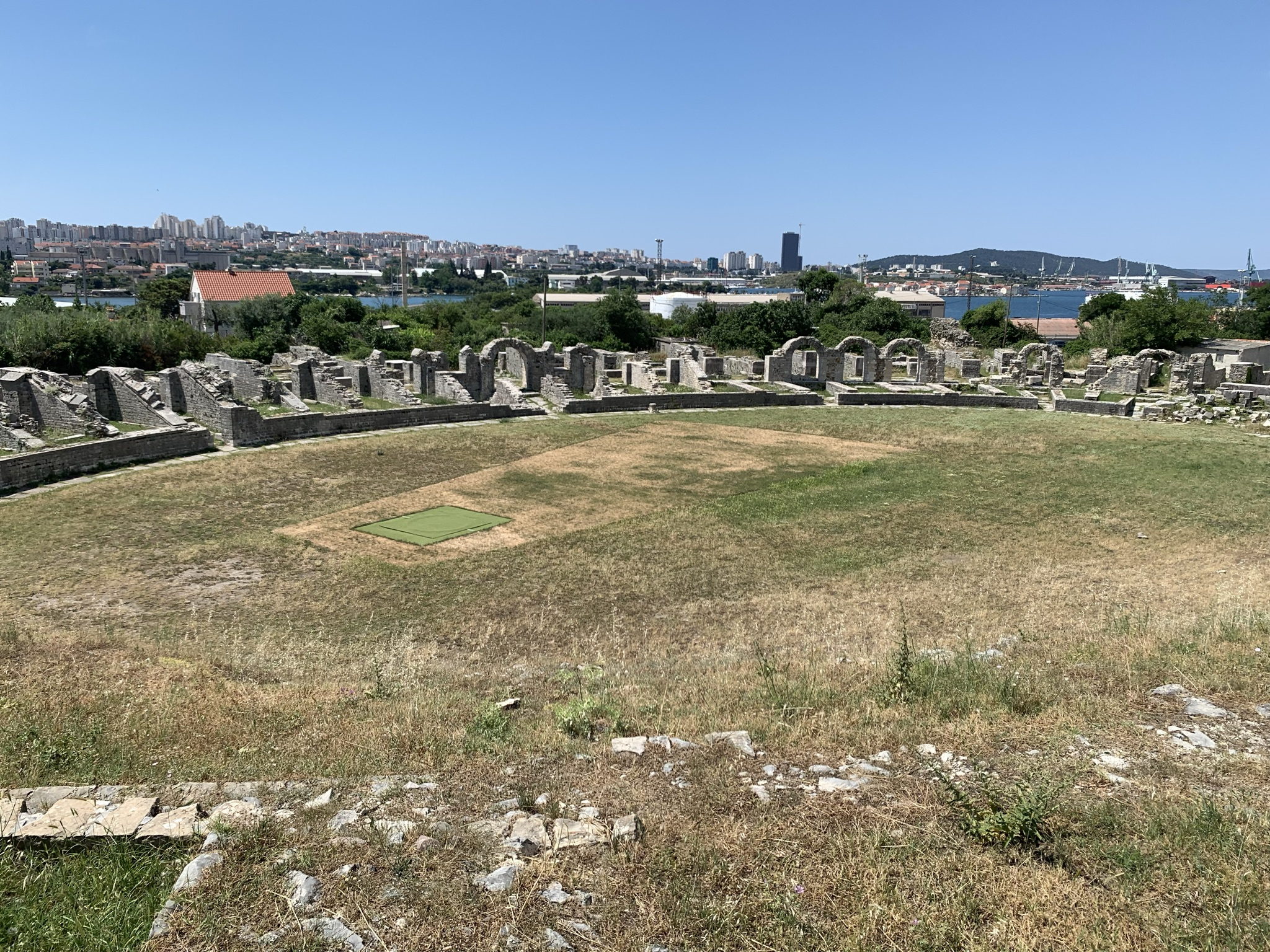
Amphitheatre in Salona

At the westernmost point of Salona, in the second half of the second century A.D., under the influence of Flavian architectural style, a monumental building was erected. The presence of a Roman amphitheatre indicates that gladiator fights were held in the city of Salona until the fifth century, when they were finally banned. The building was ellipsoidal in shape, with three floors on the south side and one floor on the north side, conveniently laid down on a natural hillside. Despite its relatively small size (125 by 100 meters (410 by 328 ft) outer shell and 65 by 40 meters (213 by 131 ft) the arena), the Salonitan amphitheatre could have been occupied by 15,000 up to 18,000 spectators. The auditorium was divided into three tiers, the lower two with seats and the upper one for standing. In Diocletian's time, the top tier was covered with a porch. Through poles attached to the outer shell of the building, the whole arena could be covered with canvas, giving protection from the sun and rain. There was a state box for the province governor on the south side and opposite it seats of honour for the city magistrates. In the centre of the arena, an opening led into an underground corridor whose purpose was the disposal of dead gladiators' bodies. On the south side of the amphitheatre, beneath the auditorium, there were two vaulted rooms where gladiators worshipped Nemesis, the goddess of revenge and destiny. During Diocletian's persecutions of Christians, the amphitheatre was used as a site of executions.

Only parts of substructures of this monumental building, as well as some fragments of architectural decoration and stone sculpture, have been preserved. The amphitheater was most severely damaged during the wars against the Turks in the seventeenth century when Venetians had it demolished for strategic reasons.

=== Marusinac ===
This cemetery complex has the martyr Anastasios thrown into the bay with the grindstone around his neck in 304 AD. The mausoleum was built in the early fourth century. In the fifth and sixth centuries, other bishops and priests were buried here.

=== Gradina ===
A medieval hill fort built on the east walls by the Turks after capturing Klis.

=== City necropolises ===
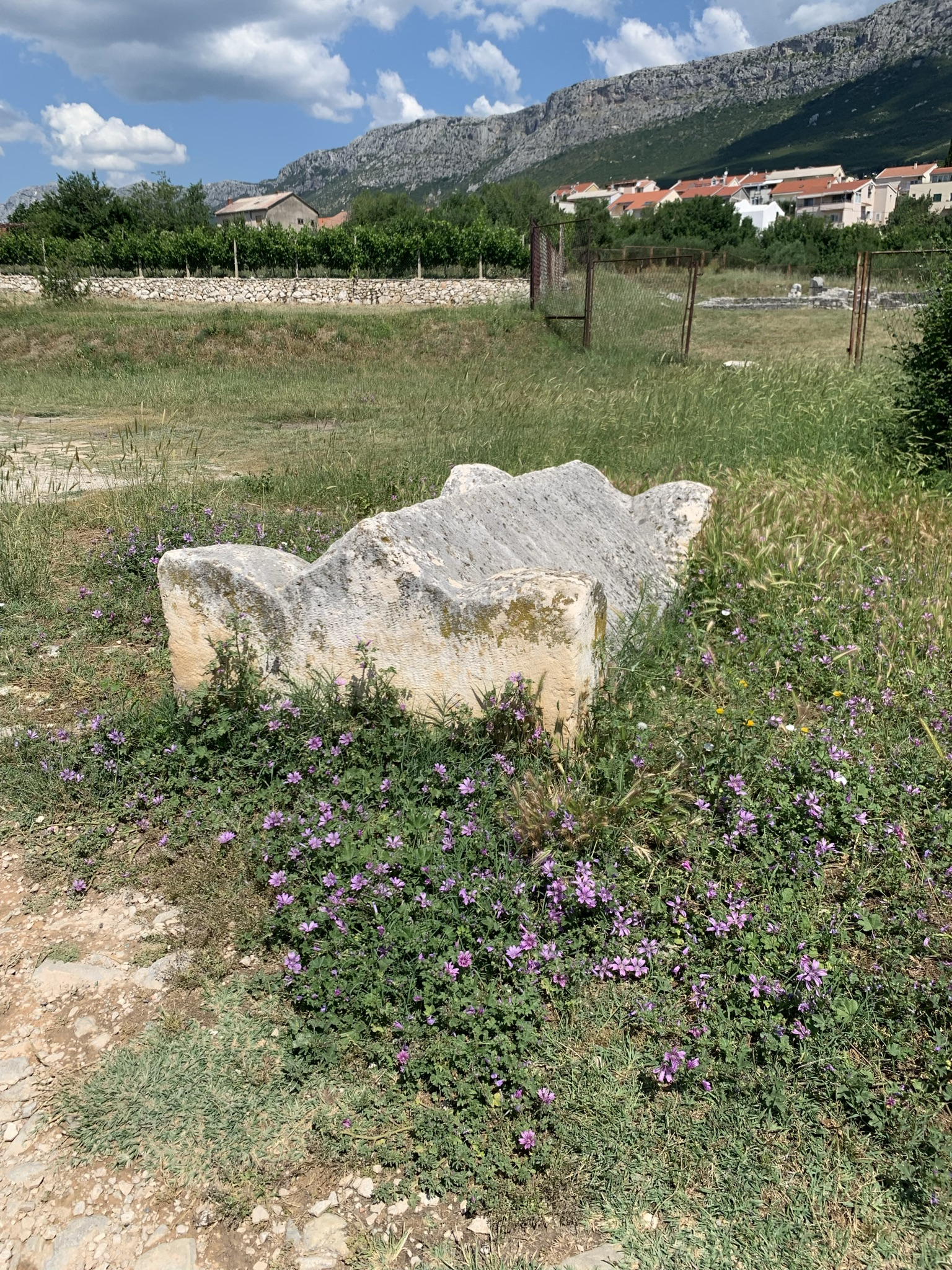
Roman Sarcophagus at Salona

Burying the dead inside the city was against Roman law, so Romans buried their dead on the roads leading out of the city.
