= Bosnian =

Bosnian may refer to:

- Anything related to the state of Bosnia and Herzegovina or its inhabitants
- Anything related to Bosnia (region) or its inhabitants
- Bosniaks, an ethnic group mainly inhabiting Bosnia and Herzegovina and one of three constitutive nations of Bosnia and Herzegovina
- Bosnians, people who live in, or come from, Bosnia and Herzegovina
- Bosnian Croats, an ethnic group and one of three constitutive nations of Bosnia and Herzegovina
- Bosnian Serbs, an ethnic group and one of the three constitutive nations of Bosnia and Herzegovina
- Bošnjani, the name of inhabitants of Bosnia during the Middle Ages
- Bosnian language

== See also ==
- Bosniak (disambiguation)
- List of Bosnians and Herzegovinians
- Languages of Bosnia and Herzegovina
- Demographics of Bosnia and Herzegovina
